= 2008 NCAA Division I men's basketball championship game =

American college basketball final

2008 NCAA Tournament Championship Game
National championship game
Kansas Jayhawks	Memphis Tigers
Big 12	C-USA
(36–3)	(38-1)
75	68
Head coach: Bill Self	Head coach: John Calipari
- AP: 4
- Coaches: 4
- AP: 2
- Coaches: 3
	1st half	2nd half	OT	Total
Kansas Jayhawks	33	30	12	75
Memphis Tigers	28	35	5	68
- Date: April 7, 2008
- Venue: Alamodome, San Antonio, Texas
- MVP: Mario Chalmers, Kansas
- Favorite: Memphis by 2
- Referees: John Cahill, Ed Hightower, Ed Corbett
- Attendance: 43,257

United States TV coverage
- Network: CBS
- Announcers: Jim Nantz (play-by-play); Billy Packer (color); Sam Ryan (sideline)
- Nielsen Ratings: 12.1

The 2008 NCAA Division I men's basketball championship game was the finals of the 2008 NCAA Division I men's basketball tournament and it determined the national champion for the 2007-08 NCAA Division I men's basketball season. The game was played on April 7, 2008, at the Alamodome in San Antonio, Texas, and featured the South Regional Champion, #1-seeded Memphis, and the Midwest Regional Champion, #1-seeded Kansas.

All four #1 seeds were in the Final Four for the first time in NCAA Tournament history and, for the second consecutive year, the national title game was played between two #1 seeds.

== Participants ==
=== Kansas Jayhawks ===
Kansas entered the tournament as the #1 seed in the Midwest Regional. In the 1st round, Kansas dominated Portland State with an 85–61 victory. In the 2nd round, Kansas beat UNLV 75–56 to advance to the Sweet 16. In the Sweet 16, Kansas beat Villanova 72–57 to advance to the Elite Eight. In the Elite Eight, Kansas was able to overcome Stephen Curry's 25 points to beat Davidson 59–57 and advance to the Final Four. In the Final Four, Brandon Rush scored 25 points to beat North Carolina 84–66 to advance to the national title game. North Carolina was coached by former Kansas head coach Roy Williams, it was the first time Williams had coached against Kansas since leaving after the 2002–03 season.

=== Memphis Tigers ===
Memphis entered the tournament as the #1 seed in the South Regional. In the 1st round of the 2008 NCAA Tournament, Memphis had a 15–2 run that eventually led to an 87–63 victory over Texas-Arlington. In the 2nd round of the 2008 NCAA Tournament, Joey Dorsey had a double-double with 13 points and 12 rebounds to lead Memphis to a 77–74 victory over Mississippi State to advance to the Sweet 16 for the 3rd consecutive year. In the Sweet 16, Memphis finally proved that they were the top seed in their region by routing Michigan State with a 92–74 victory. Memphis' 85–67 victory over Texas advanced the Tigers sent coach John Calipari to the Final Four for the first time since 1996 with UMass. In the Final Four, Derrick Rose scored 25 points to beat UCLA 78–63 and advance to the National Title Game.

Memphis was the first team in NCAA history to have 38 wins in a season, though those wins were later vacated.

== Starting lineups ==
Kansas	Position	Memphis
Brandon Rush	G	Derrick Rose
Mario Chalmers	G	† Chris Douglas-Roberts
Russell Robinson	G	Antonio Anderson
Darrell Arthur	F	Robert Dozier
Darnell Jackson	F	Joey Dorsey
† 2008 Consensus First Team All-American

== Game summary ==
CBS

April 7
9:21 PM ET

Box score

#MW1 Kansas Jayhawks 75, #S1 Memphis Tigers 68 (OT)
Scoring by half: 33–28, 30–35 Overtime: 12–5
Pts: Darrell Arthur 20; Rebs: Darrell Arthur 10; Asts: Sherron Collins 6	Pts: C. Douglas-Roberts 22; Rebs: Robert Dozier 10; Asts: Derrick Rose 8

Alamodome, San Antonio, Texas
Attendance: 43,257
Referees: John Cahill, Ed Hightower, Ed Corbett

=== 1st Half ===
Darrell Arthur's 8 points and Mario Chalmers's 5 points in the first eleven and a half minutes gave Kansas a 22–15 lead with 8:30 remaining in the first half. Then, Chris Douglas-Roberts scored 7 points in 4 minutes to tie the game at 28-28. A Brandon Rush 3-point play and a Darrell Arthur 2-point jumper gave Kansas a 33–28 lead at halftime.

=== 2nd half ===
Antonio Anderson got off to a hot start in the 2nd half to give Memphis a 36–35 lead. Then, with 13:35 remaining, Darnell Jackson scored 4 points in the next 30 seconds to give Kansas a 43–40 lead. Then, Derrick Rose would score 4 points in the next 2 minutes to cut the Kansas lead to 45–44. With 8:30 remaining with a 47–46 deficit, Derrick Rose got the show going with 10 points in the next 4 minutes to take a 56–49 lead. After Robert Dozier made a pair of free throws to give Memphis a 60–51 lead with 2 minutes remaining, Kansas began a furious comeback. It started with Darrell Arthur making a 2-point jumper and Sherron Collins making a 3-pointer to cut the Memphis lead to 60–56. A pair of Mario Chalmers free throws and a Darrell Arthur basket cut the Memphis lead to 62–60. With 10 seconds left, Derrick Rose missed the first of his two free throws and made the second to give Memphis a 63–60 lead. With 2.1 seconds left, Mario Chalmers made a 3-pointer to tie the game at 63. Robert Dozier had a chance to win it, but his desperation halfcourt heave bounced off the backboard, and the game went to overtime for the seventh time in the national title game's history, and the first time since the 1997 National Title Game, when Arizona beat Kentucky 84–79 in overtime.

=== Overtime ===
In the first two and a half minutes of overtime, Brandon Rush, Darrell Arthur, and Darnell Jackson each made a basket to give Kansas a 69–63 lead. In the next minute and a half of overtime, Chris Douglas-Roberts scored 5 points to cut the Kansas lead to 71–68 with one minute remaining. Mario Chalmers and Sherron Collins each made a pair of free throws to give Kansas a 75–68 overtime victory over Memphis and Kansas' first national championship since 1988.

== Aftermath ==
Memphis would have its entire season vacated due to problems with Derrick Rose's SATs. On March 30, 2009, John Calipari became the head coach at Kentucky.

Kansas would return to the national championship game in 2012, but they would narrowly lose to Kentucky. The Jayhawks would win their next national title in 2022.
