= Doug Wojcik =

American basketball coach (born 1964)

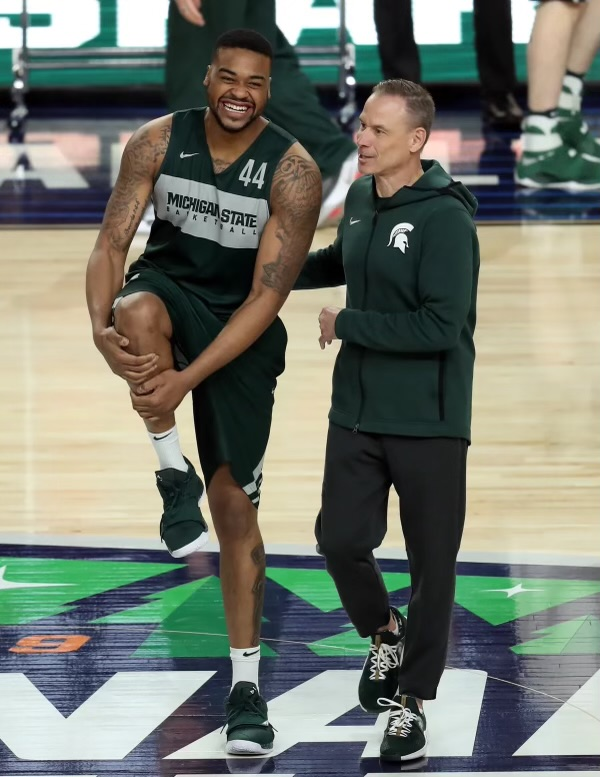

Current position
- Title: Associate Head Coach
- Team: Michigan State
- Conference: Big Ten

Biographical details
- Born: April 12, 1964 (age 62); Wheeling, West Virginia, U.S.

Playing career
- 1983–1987: Navy
- Position: Point guard

Coaching career (HC unless noted)
- 1992–1999: Navy (assistant)
- 1999–2000: Notre Dame (assistant)
- 2000–2003: North Carolina (assistant)
- 2003–2004: Michigan State (assistant)
- 2004–2005: Michigan State (associate HC)
- 2005–2012: Tulsa
- 2012–2014: Charleston
- 2015–2016: Gonzaga (special assistant)
- 2017–2018: East Carolina (assistant)
- 2021–2024: Michigan State (assistant)
- 2024–present: Michigan State (associate HC)

Administrative career (AD unless noted)
- 2018–2021: Michigan State (director of recruiting)

Head coaching record
- Overall: 178–121
- Tournaments: 1–2 (NIT); 5–2 (CBI); 9–7 (C-USA); 2–1 (SoCon); 0–1 (CAA)

Accomplishments and honors

Championships
- As head coach: CBI (2008) As Assistant: 4x Patriot League Regular Season and 3x Tournament (1994, 1997, 1998); ACC Regular Season (2001); WCC Regular Season and Tournament (2016); 3x Big Ten Regular Season (2019, 2020, 2025); Big Ten Tournament (2019); As Player: ECAC South Regular Season and Tournament (1985); 2x CAA Regular Season and Tournament (1986, 1987); Awards: CAA All Conference (1987); NABC All District (1987); USNA Coaches' Calvert Award (1987); USNA Athletic Hall of Fame; CAA 25th Anniversary Team; Big Ten Howard Moore Assistant Coach Of The Year (2025); Records: Navy's All-time Assists Leader (714); Tulsa's All-time Wins Leader (140); Military Career: Branch: United States Navy; Years of Service: 1987–1992; Rank: Lieutenant (O-3); Specialty: Surface Warfare; Ship: USS W.S. Sims (FF-1059)

Frederick Douglas Wojcik (pronounced WO-jick) (born April 12, 1964) is an American college basketball coach, former player, and former Naval officer. Currently, he is the Associate Head Coach for Tom Izzo at Michigan State University. An NCAA Division I head coach for nine years, Wojcik has averaged 20 wins per season while compiling an overall record of 178–121 (.595), and an overall conference record of 88–58 (.602). He is the winningest coach in the history of the University of Tulsa. He is a native of Wheeling, West Virginia.

== Career ==
=== Early career ===
In high school, Wojcik played at Wheeling Central Catholic High School under Skip Prosser, who went on to coach at Loyola University Maryland, Xavier University and Wake Forest University. Prosser and Wojcik led Wheeling Central Catholic to its first West Virginia SSAC "AA" State Championship in 1982. Wojcik graduated from the United States Naval Academy in 1987 and served in the Navy until 1992. While at Navy, Wojcik had a very successful playing career as a three-year starter at point guard for the Midshipmen alongside Hall of Famer David Robinson, amassing several team records for assists. He also received the Coaches' Calvert Award presented by the Naval Academy Athletic Association. Once Wojcik completed his military service, he returned to Annapolis as an assistant coach, helping Navy to four Patriot League titles and three NCAA tournament berths—in 1994, 1997, and 1998. Wojcik continued his coaching career at Notre Dame, North Carolina (2001 ACC Regular-season Champions) and Michigan State (2005 Final Four) until he was hired for his first head coaching job by Tulsa. He was considered one of the top assistants in the country, being named a "Head Coach in the Waiting" by Athlon Sports in 2001 and by ESPN's Jay Bilas in 2003. Wojcik was also recognized as "Assistant Coach on the Rise" by Andy Katz of ESPN.com.

=== University of Tulsa ===
From 2005 to 2012, Wojcik led the University of Tulsa men's basketball program and became the all-time winningest head coach in program history with 140 career wins.

In the 2005–06 season, his first year as head coach, Wojcik posted an 11–17 record with the Golden Hurricane, an improvement over two consecutive 9-win seasons in 2003–04 and 2004–05. His second season saw more improvement, with a final 20–11 overall record and a 9–7 Conference USA record, TU's first winning conference record in three years.

In his seven years at Tulsa, Wojcik posted four consecutive 20-win seasons, including back-to-back 25-win campaigns, advanced to the championship game of the Conference USA Tournament in 2008 and 2009, won the inaugural College Basketball Invitational title in 2008, and received two NIT at-large bids in 2009 and 2010.

During his tenure, Tulsa was one of C‐USA's top defensive teams and ranked among the top defenses in the country. Wojcik developed three future NBA players in Ben Uzoh, Jerome Jordan and Jordan Clarkson (2015 NBA All‐Rookie First Team, 2021 NBA Sixth Man of the Year and 2026 NBA Champion), as well as Conference USA leading scorer Justin Hurtt. He also recruited four of the top 10 all-time leading scorers in Tulsa history in Uzoh (No. 3), James Woodard (No. 4), Hurtt (No. 8) and Jerome Jordan (No. 10).

During the 2011–12 season, Wojcik won his 138th game, passing Clarence Iba as the winningest coach in school history. However, citing a decline in season ticket sales, Tulsa released him on March 11, 2012.

=== College of Charleston ===
Wojcik became head coach at the College of Charleston in 2012 and coached there for two seasons, where he led his team to a 38–29 overall mark. In his first season, the team posted a 24–11 record, secured an appearance in the Southern Conference championship game, and earned a post-season berth to the College Basketball Invitational. In year two, Wojcik transitioned his second Division I program into a higher-ranked conference, the Colonial Athletic Association.

In July 2014, an internal investigation found it "likely" Wojcik had been verbally abusive toward players. Outgoing president P. George Benson retained but suspended Wojcik for the month of August. On August 6, new president Glenn McConnell announced Wojcik had been fired for "just cause." Since Wojcik was still under contract, the matter was briefly disputed between the two parties. However, in September 2014, Charleston and Wojcik reached a settlement, and agreed not to make further comments on the issue.

=== Gonzaga ===
Wojcik served as the special assistant to Gonzaga head coach Mark Few during the 2015–16 season, where the Bulldogs earned their fourth-straight West Coast Conference regular-season and tournament titles, their 18th consecutive appearance in the NCAA Tournament, and a second-straight Sweet 16 berth with a 28–8 overall record.

=== East Carolina ===
Wojcik served as the assistant men's basketball coach for East Carolina of the American Athletic Conference for the 2017–18 season.

=== Michigan State ===
Wojcik was named Tom Izzo's Director of Recruiting for Michigan State during the 2018–19 season. That season, the Spartans won both the Big Ten regular-season and tournament championships, and advanced to the 2019 Final Four. In 2019–20, Michigan State won its third-consecutive Big Ten regular-season championship. In May 2021, Wojcik was promoted to assistant coach; furthermore, in June 2024, Wojcik was promoted to Associate Head Coach. The following season, 2024–2025, the Spartans won the Big Ten regular season championship, won 30 games, advanced to the Elite Eight while Wojcik was named the Big Ten Howard Moore Assistant Coach of the Year.

== Personal life ==
Doug Wojcik married former U.S. Naval Academy women's basketball and track athlete, Lael House, in 1998. Their two boys played college basketball: Paxson played at and graduated from Brown University, where he was the team captain and named All-Ivy League. Paxson finished his college career at the University of North Carolina-Chapel Hill as a graduate transfer – helping the Tar Heels win the 2024 Atlantic Coast Conference regular-season title, and advancing to the NCAA Tournament Sweet Sixteen. Denham played at and graduated from Harvard University, where he served as a team captain. Denham finished his college career at Michigan State University as a graduate transfer, playing under Hall of Fame head coach Tom Izzo – helping the Spartans to a 2026 Big Ten second place finish and the NCAA Tournament Sweet Sixteen.

Doug Wojcik's younger brother Dave Wojcik is a long-time college and high school basketball coach as well.

== Head coaching record ==
Record table
Season	Team	Overall	Conference	Standing	Postseason
Tulsa Golden Hurricane (Conference USA) (2005–2012)
2005–06	Tulsa	11–17	6–8	T–6th	
2006–07	Tulsa	20–11	9–7	T–4th	
2007–08	Tulsa	25–14	8–8	T–5th	CBI champion
2008–09	Tulsa	25–11	12–4	2nd	NIT Second Round
2009–10	Tulsa	23–12	10–6	4th	NIT First Round
2010–11	Tulsa	19–13	11–5	T–2nd	
2011–12	Tulsa	17–14	10–6	T–3rd	
Tulsa:		140–92 (.603)	68–44 (.607)		
College of Charleston Cougars (Southern Conference) (2012–2013)
2012–13	College of Charleston	24–11	14–4	2nd (South)	CBI First Round
College of Charleston Cougars (Colonial Athletic Association) (2013–2014)
2013–14	College of Charleston	14–18	6–10	6th	
College of Charleston:		38–29 (.567)	20–14 (.588)		
Total:		178–121 (.595)			
National champion Postseason invitational champion Conference regular season champion Conference regular season and conference tournament champion Division regular season champion Division regular season and conference tournament champion Conference tournament champion
