= 2008 College Basketball Invitational =

College basketball tournament

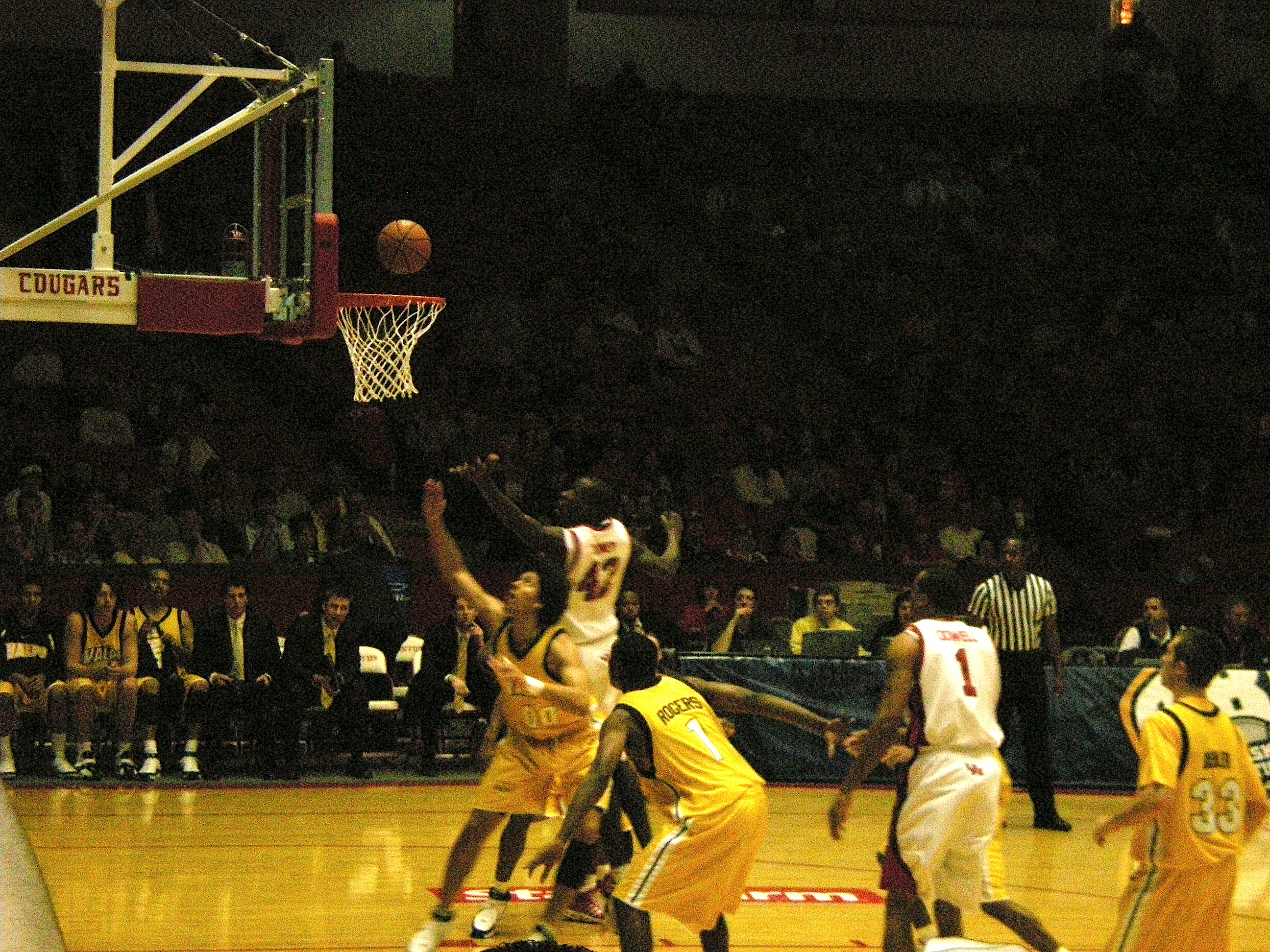
- Houston and Valparaiso at during the 2008 CBI quarterfinals.
- Teams: 16
- Finals site: Reynolds Center; Carver Arena, Tulsa, Oklahoma; Peoria, Illinois
- Champions: Tulsa Golden Hurricane (1st title)
- Runner-up: Bradley Braves (1st title game)
- Semifinalists: Houston Cougars (1st semifinal); Virginia Cavaliers (1st semifinal)
- Winning coach: Doug Wojcik (1st title)
- MVP: Jerome Jordan (Tulsa)

The 2008 College Basketball Invitational (CBI) was a single-elimination tournament of 16 National Collegiate Athletic Association (NCAA) Division I teams that did not participate in the 2008 NCAA Division I men's basketball tournament or the 2008 National Invitation Tournament. The inaugural tournament began on March 18 on campus sites and ended on April 4, won by the University of Tulsa, defeating their former Missouri Valley Conference rivals Bradley University in the best-of-three final. Tulsa center Jerome Jordan was the tournament MVP. The CBI was the first newly created post-season tournament since the Collegiate Commissioners Association Tournament in 1974.

The opening round was played on March 18 and 19, 2008 with the second round being played on March 24 and the semifinals on March 26. The championship was a best-of-three series with games being played on March 31, April 2, and April 4 of that year. The bracketing was done in East, West, South and Midwest regions. Following the quarterfinals, the teams were reseeded.

Besides Tulsa and Bradley, Brown, Cincinnati, Houston, Miami (Ohio), Nevada, Old Dominion, Ohio, Richmond, Rider, Utah, UTEP, Valparaiso, Virginia and Washington also participated in the tournament. New Mexico State turned down a CBI bid for financial reasons. Alabama, Seton Hall, Texas Tech, and Wake Forest turned down invitations as well for other various reasons.

== Bracket ==
First round
E1 | Virginia | 66
E4 | Richmond | 64
E2 | Old Dominion | 68
E3 | Rider | 65
M1 | Bradley | 70
M4 | Cincinnati | 67
M2 | Ohio | 80
M3 | Brown | 74
S1 | UTEP | 69
S4 | Utah | 81
S2 | Tulsa | 61
S3 | Miami (Ohio) | 45
W1 | Washington | 71
W4 | Valparaiso | 72
W2 | Nevada | 79
W3 | Houston | 80

Quarterfinals
E1 | Virginia | 80
E2 | Old Dominion | 76
M1 | Bradley | 79
M2 | Ohio | 73
S4 | Utah | 60
S2 | Tulsa | 69
W4 | Valparaiso | 67
W3 | Houston | 91

Semifinals (Reseeded)
1 | Virginia | 85
4 | Bradley | 96
2 | Tulsa | 73
3 | Houston | 69

Finals (Best of three)
4 | Bradley | 68 | 83 | 64
2 | Tulsa | 73 | 74 | 70
