= 2007–08 Tulsa Golden Hurricane men's basketball team =

American college basketball season

2007–08 Tulsa Golden Hurricane men's basketball

CBI Champions
- Conference: Conference USA
- Record: 25–14 (8–8 C-USA)
- Head coach: Doug Wojcik (3rd season)
- Assistant coaches: Jeremy Ballard (1st season); Dave Wojcik (3rd season); David Cason (3rd season); Andy Kohut (3rd season)
- Home arena: Reynolds Center

2007–08 Conference USA men's basketball standings
	Conf.				Overall
Team	W		L	PCT	W		L	PCT
No. 2 Memphis	16	–	0	1.000	38	–	2	.950
UAB	12	–	4	.750	23	–	11	.676
Houston	11	–	5	.688	24	–	10	.706
Southern Miss	9	–	7	.563	19	–	14	.576
UCF	9	–	7	.563	16	–	15	.516
Tulsa	8	–	8	.500	25	–	14	.641
UTEP	8	–	8	.500	19	–	14	.576
Marshall	8	–	8	.500	16	–	14	.533
Tulane	6	–	10	.375	17	–	15	.531
East Carolina	5	–	11	.313	11	–	19	.367
SMU	4	–	12	.250	10	–	20	.333
Rice	0	–	16	.000	3	–	27	.100
† 2008 C-USA Tournament winner Rankings from AP Poll

The 2007–08 Tulsa Golden Hurricane men's basketball team represented the University of Tulsa in National Collegiate Athletic Association (NCAA) Division I men's basketball during the 2007–08 season. Playing in Conference USA (C-USA) and led by third-year head coach Doug Wojcik, the Golden Hurricane finished the season with a 25–14 overall record and won the 2008 College Basketball Invitational – the first year of the tournament's existence.

In C-USA play, the Golden Hurricane finished in sixth place with a 8–8 record. They advanced to the championship game of the 2008 C-USA tournament, where they lost to top-seeded Memphis, 77–51.

== Roster ==
2007–08 Tulsa Golden Hurricane men's basketball team
Players
Coaches

Pos.	#	Name	Height	Weight	Year	Previous school	Hometown
G	1	Ben Uzoh	6 ft 3 in (1.91 m)	190 lb (86 kg)	So	Warren HS	San Antonio, Texas
F	4	Calvin Walls	6 ft 7 in (2.01 m)	235 lb (107 kg)	Sr	Iowa Western CC	Minneapolis, Minnesota
G	5	Brett McDade	6 ft 0 in (1.83 m)	170 lb (77 kg)	RS Sr	Billy Ryan HS	Denton, Texas
G	10	Joey Kieval	6 ft 0 in (1.83 m)	178 lb (81 kg)	RS So	Memorial HS	Houston, Texas
F	11	Steven Idlet	6 ft 9 in (2.06 m)	220 lb (100 kg)	Fr	Prairie Grove HS	Prairie Grove, Arkansas
F	12	Bishop Wheatley	6 ft 6 in (1.98 m)	215 lb (98 kg)	RS So	Cedar Hill HS	Cedar Hill, Texas
G	15	Justin Hurtt	6 ft 4 in (1.93 m)	180 lb (82 kg)	Fr	Archbishop O'Hara HS	Raytown, Missouri
G	22	Glenn Andrews	6 ft 3 in (1.91 m)	185 lb (84 kg)	Fr	T. C. Williams HS	Alexandria, Virginia
F	22	Jamel McLean	6 ft 8 in (2.03 m)	245 lb (111 kg)	So	Bethel High HS	Hampton, VA
C	23	Jerome Jordan	7 ft 0 in (2.13 m)	235 lb (107 kg)	So	Florida Preparatory Academy	Kingston, Jamaica
G	33	Rod Earls	6 ft 2 in (1.88 m)	194 lb (88 kg)	RS Sr	Paris JC	Little Rock, Arkansas
F/C	45	Sam Mitchell	6 ft 9 in (2.06 m)	240 lb (109 kg)	Jr	Bartlesville HS	Bartlesville, Oklahoma
F	53	Ray Reese	6 ft 5 in (1.96 m)	215 lb (98 kg)	Jr	Westchester HS	Los Angeles, California

Head coach

- Doug Wojcik (Navy '87)

Assistant coach(es)

- Jeremy Ballard (Colgate '03)
- Dave Wojcik (Loyola (MD) '91)
- David Cason (Illinois State '96)
- Andy Kohut (Purdue '03)

Legend

- (C) Team captain
- (S) Suspended
- (I) Ineligible
- (W) Walk-on
- Injured
- Current redshirt

Roster
Last update: 9–8–2019

== Schedule and results ==
Date time, TV	Rank^{#}	Opponent^{#}	Result	Record	Site (attendance) city, state
Exhibition
11/5/07*; 7:00 pm		Missouri Southern	W 86–48	—	Reynolds Center (4,376); Tulsa, OK
Non-conference regular season
November 11, 2007*; 4:00 pm		vs. Hampton; O'Reilly Auto Parts/CBE	L 55–72	0–1	Comcast Center (17,950); College Park, MD
November 12, 2007*; 5:00 pm		vs. North Florida; O'Reilly Auto Parts/CBE	W 83–66	1–1	Comcast Center (17,950); College Park, MD
November 16, 2007*; 7:00 pm		Arkansas State	W 75–59	2–1	Reynolds Center (4,842); Tulsa, OK
November 27, 2007*; 7:05 pm		at Oral Roberts	L 70–84	2–2	Mabee Center (7,436); Tulsa, OK
December 1, 2007*; 7:00 pm		at Arkansas–Little Rock	L 51–62	2–3	Jack Stephens Center (3,976); Little Rock, AR
December 5, 2007*; 7:00 pm		at Oklahoma	L 55–81	2–4	Lloyd Noble Center (9,203); Norman, OK
December 9, 2007*; 2:00 pm		Central Arkansas	W 65–52	3–4	Reynolds Center (4,632); Tulsa, OK
December 15, 2007*; 7:00 pm		Texas–Pan American	W 90–61	4–4	Reynolds Center (4,860); Tulsa, OK
December 18, 2007*; 7:00 pm		Charlotte	W 75–63	5–4	Reynolds Center (4,746); Tulsa, OK
December 22, 2007*; 4:00 pm		Southeast Missouri State	W 89–51	6–4	Reynolds Center (4,882); Tulsa, OK
December 30, 2007*; 2:00 pm		Mississippi Valley State	W 71–46	7–4	Reynolds Center (5,175); Tulsa, OK
January 7, 2008*; 8:00 pm		at Colorado	W 81–68	8–4	Coors Events/Conference Center (2,031); Boulder, CO
Conference regular season
January 12, 2008; 6:00 pm		at UCF	L 91–97 ^{3OT}	8–5 (0–1)	UCF Arena (7,093); Orlando, FL
January 16, 2008; 8:00 pm, CSTV		Tulane	L 65–67 ^{OT}	8–6 (0–2)	Reynolds Center (6,101); Tulsa, OK
January 19, 2008; 7:00 pm		at SMU	W 72–71	9–6 (1–2)	Moody Coliseum (3,024); University Park, TX
January 23, 2008; 7:00 pm, CSTV		No. 1 Memphis	L 41–56	9–7 (1–3)	Reynolds Center (8,475); Tulsa, OK
January 26, 2008; 8:35 pm		at UTEP	L 61–65	9–8 (1–4)	Don Haskins Center (9,447); El Paso, TX
January 30, 2008; 6:00 pm		at Marshall	L 65–72 ^{OT}	9–9 (1–5)	Cam Henderson Center (4,317); Huntington, WV
February 2, 2008; 8:00 pm, CSTV		SMU	W 72–60	10–9 (2–5)	Reynolds Center (7,016); Tulsa, OK
February 6, 2008; 7:00 pm		at Houston	L 81–92	10–10 (2–6)	Hofheinz Pavilion (3,502); Houston, TX
February 9, 2008; 7:00 pm		at Southern Miss	W 78–63	11–10 (3–6)	Reynolds Center (5,323); Tulsa, OK
February 13, 2008; 6:00 pm		at East Carolina	W 66–61	12–10 (4–6)	Williams Arena (3,731); Greenville, NC
February 16, 2008; 7:00 pm		UTEP	W 73–50	13–10 (5–6)	Reynolds Center (5,383); Tulsa, OK
February 20, 2008; 7:00 pm		Rice	W 68–37	14–10 (6–6)	Reynolds Center (5,059); Tulsa, OK
February 23, 2008*; 2:00 pm		Presbyterian	W 77–58	15–10	Reynolds Center (5,079); Tulsa, OK
February 27, 2008; 7:00 pm, CSTV		at No. 2 Memphis	L 67–82	15–11 (6–7)	FedExForum (17,179); Memphis, TN
March 1, 2008; 7:00 pm		Marshall	W 89–64	16–11 (7–7)	Reynolds Center (5,346); Tulsa, OK
March 5, 2008; 7:00 pm		at UAB	L 70–84	16–12 (7–8)	Bartow Arena (6,339); Birmingham, AL
March 8, 2008; 7:00 pm		at UCF	W 85–73	17–12 (8–8)	Reynolds Center (5,848); Tulsa, OK
Conference USA tournament
March 12, 2008; 12:00 pm, CSTV	(7)	vs. (10) East Carolina; First Round	W 66–49	18–12	FedExForum (10,954); Memphis, TN
March 13, 2008; 12:00 pm, CSTV	(7)	vs. (2) UAB; Second Round	W 78–68 ^{OT}	19–12	FedExForum (10,883); Memphis, TN
March 14, 2008; 6:00 pm, CSTV	(7)	vs. (6) UTEP; Semifinals	W 64–62 ^{OT}	20–12	FedExForum (11,812); Memphis, TN
March 15, 2008; 10:35 am, CBS	(7)	at (1) No. 2 Memphis; Championship Game	L 51–77	20–13	FedExForum (14,071); Memphis, TN
CBI
March 19, 2008*; 7:00 pm, Fox College Sports	(S2)	(S3) Miami (Oh); First Round	W 61–45	21–13	Reynolds Center (5,365); Tulsa, OK
March 24, 2008*; 8:00 pm, Fox College Sports	(S2)	(S4) Utah; Quarterfinals	W 69–60	22–13	Reynolds Center (5,764); Tulsa, OK
March 26, 2008*; 8:00 pm, Fox College Sports	(2)	(3) Houston; Semifinals	W 73–69	23–13	Reynolds Center (5,339); Tulsa, OK
March 31, 2008*; 7:03 pm, Fox College Sports	(2)	(4) Bradley; Finals, Game 1	W 73–68	24–13	Reynolds Center (7,337); Tulsa, OK
April 2, 2008*; 7:00 pm, Fox College Sports	(2)	at (4) Bradley; Finals Game 2	L 74–83	24–14	Carver Arena (9,014); Peoria, IL
April 4, 2008*; 7:00 pm, Fox College Sports	(2)	(4) Bradley; Finals, Game 3	W 70–64	25–14	Reynolds Center (8,455); Tulsa, OK
*Non-conference game. ^{#}Rankings from AP Poll. (#) Tournament seedings in parentheses.
