= 2008 Conference USA men's basketball tournament =

- Classification: Division I
- Season: 2007–08
- Teams: 12
- Site: FedExForum; Memphis, Tennessee
- Champions: Memphis (3rd title)
- Winning coach: John Calipari (3rd title)
- MVP: Antonio Anderson (Memphis)

2007–08 Conference USA men's basketball standings
	Conf.				Overall
Team	W		L	PCT	W		L	PCT
No. 2 Memphis	16	–	0	1.000	38	–	2	.950
UAB	12	–	4	.750	23	–	11	.676
Houston	11	–	5	.688	24	–	10	.706
Southern Miss	9	–	7	.563	19	–	14	.576
UCF	9	–	7	.563	16	–	15	.516
Tulsa	8	–	8	.500	25	–	14	.641
UTEP	8	–	8	.500	19	–	14	.576
Marshall	8	–	8	.500	16	–	14	.533
Tulane	6	–	10	.375	17	–	15	.531
East Carolina	5	–	11	.313	11	–	19	.367
SMU	4	–	12	.250	10	–	20	.333
Rice	0	–	16	.000	3	–	27	.100
† 2008 C-USA Tournament winner Rankings from AP Poll

The 2008 Conference USA men's basketball tournament was won by Memphis. By winning the tournament, Memphis received the conference's automatic bid to the NCAA tournament. It took place March 12–15, 2008, at the FedExForum in Memphis, Tennessee. However, the NCAA vacated Memphis' standings after Derrick Rose was found ineligible.

== 2008 Conference USA tournament ==
First round March 12
8	Marshall	47
9	Tulane	48
5	Southern Miss	59
12	Rice	50
7	Tulsa	66
10	East Carolina	49
6	UTEP	71
11	SMU	49

Second round March 13
9	Tulane	56
1	#2 Memphis	75
5	Southern Miss	68
4	UCF	62
7	Tulsa	78*
2	UAB	68*
6	UTEP	80
3	Houston	77

Semifinals; March 14
1	#2 Memphis	69
5	Southern Miss	53
7	Tulsa	64*
6	UTEP	62*

C-USA Championship Game; March 15
1	#2 Memphis	77
7	Tulsa	51

Asterisk denotes game ended in overtime.
