= Antonio Anderson =

American basketball player (born 1985)

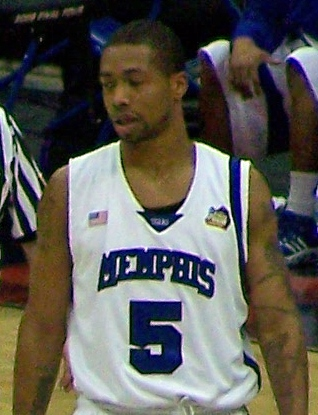
- Anderson with the Memphis Tigers in 2008

Personal information
- Born: June 5, 1985 (age 41) Lynn, Massachusetts, U.S.
- Listed height: 6 ft 6 in (1.98 m)
- Listed weight: 215 lb (98 kg)

Career information
- High school: Lynn Vocational (Lynn, Massachusetts)
- College: Memphis (2005–2009)
- NBA draft: 2009: undrafted
- Playing career: 2009–2013
- Position: Shooting guard
- Number: 8

Career history
- 2009–2010: Rio Grande Valley Vipers
- 2010: Oklahoma City Thunder
- 2010–2011: Rio Grande Valley Vipers
- 2010: Caciques de Humacao
- 2011: Maine Red Claws
- 2011: Ratiopharm Ulm
- 2011: Maine Red Claws
- 2012–2013: Saint John Mill Rats

Career highlights
- D-League champion (2010); All-NBA D-League Third Team (2010); C-USA tournament MVP (2008) (Note: All wins and NCAA Tournament games, including the 2008 C-USA tournament final victory, from the 2007–08 Memphis season were vacated because an ineligible player.)
- Stats at NBA.com
- Stats at Basketball Reference

Antonio Andrew Anderson (born June 5, 1985) is an American former basketball player and the current head coach at Darrow School. He majored in interdisciplinary studies at the University of Memphis and played basketball for several years professionally.

== College career ==
Anderson was born in Lynn, Massachusetts and attended the University of Memphis. In the 2007–08 season (his junior year at Memphis), Anderson started alongside Derrick Rose, Joey Dorsey, Chris Douglas-Roberts, and Robert Dozier. In his senior season he put up career numbers, including 10.7 points per game as well as 5.0 rebounds and 4.1 assists per game. On January 3, 2009, Anderson became only the second player in Memphis history to record a triple-double, the other being Anfernee "Penny" Hardaway, with 12 points, 10 rebounds, and 13 assists in a home game against the Lamar Cardinals.

== Professional career ==
After his senior season, Anderson went undrafted in the 2009 NBA draft. He was added to Charlotte Bobcats training camp roster, however, on October 22, 2009, he was waived by the Bobcats and joined the Rio Grande Valley Vipers of the NBA D-League. On February 22, 2010, Anderson was signed to his first of two 10-day contracts with the Oklahoma City Thunder. After his second ten-day contract expired, Anderson rejoined the Rio Grande Valley Vipers. He scored two points while appearing in one NBA game during his stint with the Thunder.

In 2010, Anderson resigned with the Vipers, with whom he was averaging 9.1 points through 8 games in 2010. He was eventually traded to the Maine Red Claws.

In September 2011, Anderson signed a one-year contract with ratiopharm Ulm in Germany. In November of that year, Anderson requested and received his release and returned to the NBA Development League's Maine Red Claws. On December 25, 2011, he was waived by the Red Claws due to injury. In October 2012, he joined the Saint John Mill Rats of Canada.

== Career statistics ==
Legend
GP	Games played	GS	Games started	MPG	Minutes per game
FG%	Field goal percentage	3P%	3-point field goal percentage	FT%	Free throw percentage
RPG	Rebounds per game	APG	Assists per game	SPG	Steals per game
BPG	Blocks per game	PPG	Points per game	**Bold**	Career high

=== NBA ===
==== Regular season ====
Year	Team	GP	GS	MPG	FG%	3P%	FT%	RPG	APG	SPG	BPG	PPG
2009–10	Oklahoma	1	0	14.6	.333	–	–	1.0	.0	.0	.0	2.0

=== College ===
Year	Team	GP	GS	MPG	FG%	3P%	FT%	RPG	APG	SPG	BPG	PPG
2005–06	Memphis	37	21	27.3	.421	**.365**	.633	3.4	2.8	1.5	0.3	7.2
2006–07	Memphis	36	35	28.0	.390	.245	.634	4.1	3.6	**1.6**	0.3	8.0
2007–08	Memphis	**40**	**40**	29.5	.408	.333	.570	3.7	3.4	1.2	0.3	8.6
2008–09	Memphis	37	37	**34.3**	**.450**	.254	**.733**	**4.8**	**4.5**	1.4	**0.5**	**10.2**
Career		150	133	29.8	.418	.308	.648	4.0	3.6	1.4	0.3	8.5

== See also ==
- List of NCAA Division I men's basketball players with 145 games played
