= 2007–08 UCF Knights men's basketball team =

American college basketball season

2007–08 UCF Knights men's basketball

UCF Holiday Classic Champions
- Conference: Conference USA
- Record: 16–15 (9–7 C-USA)
- Head coach: Kirk Speraw
- Assistant coaches: Mike Jaskulski; Craig Brown; Dwight Evans
- Home arena: UCF Arena

2007–08 Conference USA men's basketball standings
	Conf.				Overall
Team	W		L	PCT	W		L	PCT
No. 2 Memphis	16	–	0	1.000	38	–	2	.950
UAB	12	–	4	.750	23	–	11	.676
Houston	11	–	5	.688	24	–	10	.706
Southern Miss	9	–	7	.563	19	–	14	.576
UCF	9	–	7	.563	16	–	15	.516
Tulsa	8	–	8	.500	25	–	14	.641
UTEP	8	–	8	.500	19	–	14	.576
Marshall	8	–	8	.500	16	–	14	.533
Tulane	6	–	10	.375	17	–	15	.531
East Carolina	5	–	11	.313	11	–	19	.367
SMU	4	–	12	.250	10	–	20	.333
Rice	0	–	16	.000	3	–	27	.100
† 2008 C-USA Tournament winner Rankings from AP Poll

The 2007–08 UCF Knights men's basketball team was an NCAA Division I college basketball team that represented the University of Central Florida and competed in Conference USA. They played their home games at the UCF Arena in Orlando, Florida, and were led by head coach Kirk Speraw, who was in his 15th season with the team. In the previous year, the Knights finished the season 22–9, 11–5 in C-USA play.

The 2007–08 season marked the first year that the Knights played in the new UCF Arena. From 1991 to 2007, the team played in the original UCF Arena, now known as The Venue at UCF.

== Roster ==
2007–08 UCF Knights men's basketball team
Players
Coaches

Pos.	#	Name	Height	Weight	Year	Hometown
G/F	1	Jermaine Taylor	6 ft 4 in (1.93 m)	205 lb (93 kg)	Jr	Tavares, FL
F	2	Troy Davis	6 ft 7 in (2.01 m)	195 lb (88 kg)	So	Sarasota, FL
G	3	Dave Noel	6 ft 3 in (1.91 m)	205 lb (93 kg)	Sr	Boynton Beach, FL
G	4	Mike O'Donnell	6 ft 0 in (1.83 m)	180 lb (82 kg)	Sr	Largo, FL
G	5	Chip Cartwright	6 ft 0 in (1.83 m)	165 lb (75 kg)	Sr	Houston, TX
G	10	Drew Speraw	6 ft 2 in (1.88 m)	175 lb (79 kg)	So	Oviedo, FL
G	11	Mike Battle	6 ft 4 in (1.93 m)	210 lb (95 kg)	Sr	Waldorf, MD
G	12	Taylor Young	6 ft 1 in (1.85 m)	195 lb (88 kg)	Fr	Orlando, FL
F/C	13	Kenrick Zondervan	6 ft 9 in (2.06 m)	250 lb (113 kg)	Jr	Hoofddorp, Holland
F	14	Andre Thornton	6 ft 6 in (1.98 m)	240 lb (109 kg)	Sr	Memphis, TN
G	20	Chris Baez	6 ft 5 in (1.96 m)	185 lb (84 kg)	Fr	Kissimmeeo, FL
C	21	Stanley Billings	6 ft 11 in (2.11 m)	240 lb (109 kg)	Sr	Orlando, FL
F	22	Cordell Pope	6 ft 7 in (2.01 m)	170 lb (77 kg)	Fr	Birmingham, AL
F	25	A.J. Tyler (redshirt)	6 ft 9 in (2.06 m)	230 lb (104 kg)	So	Palm Harbor, FL
F	34	Jean Michael Yotio	6 ft 9 in (2.06 m)	235 lb (107 kg)	Fr	Abidjan, Ivory Coast
C	35	Will Bakanowsky	6 ft 9 in (2.06 m)	230 lb (104 kg)	Sr	Gibbsboro, NJ

Head coach

- Kirk Speraw (Iowa)

Assistant coach(es)

- Mike Jaskulski (St. Norbert)
- Craig Brown (Florida)
- Dwight Evans (Birmingham–Southern)

Legend

- (C) Team captain
- (S) Suspended
- (I) Ineligible
- (W) Walk-on
- Injured
- Current redshirt

Roster
Last update: March 2008

== Schedule and results ==
Date time, TV	Rank^{#}	Opponent^{#}	Result	Record	Site city, state
Exhibition
November 3, 2007*; 11:00 am, no		St. Leo	W 86–78	1–0	UCF Arena; Orlando, FL
November 6, 2007*; 7:00 pm, no		Florida Southern	W 83–57	2–0	UCF Arena; Orlando, FL
Regular season (non-conference play)
November 11, 2007*; 2:00 pm, no		Nevada	W 63–60	1–0	UCF Arena (4,668); Orlando, FL
November 16, 2007*; 7:00 pm, no		vs. Norfolk State	W 78–64	2–0	UCF Arena (5,277); Orlando, FL
November 22, 2007*; 7:00 pm, no		vs. No. 19 Villanova; Old Spice Classic	L 68–76	2–1	HP Field House (3,457); Lake Buena Vista, FL
November 23, 2007*; 7:30 pm, no		vs. No. 18 Kansas State; Old Spice Classic	L 71–73 ^{OT}	2–2	HP Field House (2,903); Lake Buena Vista, FL
November 25, 2007*; 11:00 am, no		vs. Penn State; Old Spice Classic	W 70–59	3–2	HP Field House (783); Lake Buena Vista, FL
November 28, 2007*; 7:00 pm, no		Presbyterian	W 80–53	4–2	UCF Arena (4,733); Orlando, FL
December 1, 2007*; 7:00 pm, no		at South Florida; UCF–USF rivalry	L 67–75	4–3	Sun Dome (4,031); Tampa, FL
December 8, 2007*; 7:00 pm, no		Ole Miss	L 67–76	4–4	UCF Arena (5,574); Orlando, FL
December 11, 2007*; 6:30 pm, no		Louisiana-Lafayette	W 65–52	5–4	UCF Arena (3,604); Orlando, FL
December 16, 2007*; 8:00 pm, no		at Nevada	L 74–86	5–5	Lawlor Events Center (7,180); Reno, NV
December 28, 2007*; 8:00 pm, no		Connecticut	L 82–85	5–6	UCF Arena (6,224); Orlando, FL
December 30, 2007*; 3:30 pm, no		New Jersey Institute of Technology; UCF Holiday Classic	W 82–50	6–6	UCF Arena (3,321); Orlando, FL
December 31, 2007*; 3:30 pm, no		Long Island; UCF Holiday Classic	W 78–69	7–6	UCF Arena (3,207); Orlando, FL
January 5, 2008*; 3:00 pm, no		at Sam Houston State	L 58–60	7–7	Bernard Johnson Coliseum (1,160); Huntsville, TX
Regular season (C-USA conference play)
January 8, 2008; 9:00 pm, no		at Southern Miss	W 52–41	8–7 (1–0)	Reed Green Coliseum (3,134); Hattiesburg, MS
January 12, 2008; 7:00 pm, no		Tulsa	W 97–91 ^{3OT}	9–7 (2–0)	UCF Arena (7,097); Orlando, FL
January 13, 2008; 8:00 pm, no		at UAB			Bartow Arena; Birmingham, AL
January 19, 2008; 7:00 pm, no		at East Carolina	W 71–66	10–7 (3–0)	Williams Arena at Minges Coliseum (5,541); Greenville, NC
January 23, 2008; 7:00 pm, no		UTEP	W 109–80	11–7 (4–0)	UCF Arena (5,183); Orlando, FL
January 26, 2008; 8:00 pm, no		at SMU	L 67–69 ^{OT}	11–8 (4–1)	Moody Coliseum (3,014); Dallas, TX
January 30, 2008; 7:00 pm, no		UAB	L 81–88	11–9 (4–2)	UCF Arena (4,865); Oralndo, FL
February 2, 2008; 7:00 pm, no		Houston	L 81–84	11–10 (4–3)	UCF Arena (5,682); Orlando, FL
February 6, 2008; 7:00 pm, no		Marshall	W 77–63	12–10 (5–3)	UCF Arena (4,488); Orlando, FL
February 9, 2008; 4:00 pm, no		at No. 1 Memphis	L 64–85	12–11 (5–4)	FedExForum (17,833); Memphis, TN
February 16, 2008; 3:00 pm, no		at Rice	W 60–53	13–11 (6–4)	Reliant Arena (270); Houston, TX
February 20, 2008; 7:00 pm, no		East Carolina	W 110–75	14–11 (7–4)	UCF Arena (4,323); Orlando, FL
February 23, 2008; 2:00 pm, no		at Marshall	L 66–71	14–12 (7–5)	Cam Henderson Center (5,150); Huntington, WV
February 27, 2008; 7:00 pm, no		Tulane	W 80–63	15–12 (8–5)	UCF Arena (4,401); Orlando, FL
March 1, 2008; 7:00 pm, no		Rice	W 68–60	16–12 (9–5)	UCF Arena (5,606); Orlando, FL
March 5, 2008; 8:00 pm, no		at Houston	L 68–73	16–13 (9–6)	Hofheinz Pavilion (4,516); Houston, TX
March 8, 2008; 8:00 pm, no		at Tulsa	L 53–71	16–14 (9–7)	Reynolds Center (5,848); Tulsa, OK
C-USA tournament
March 13, 2008; 9:30 pm, no		vs. Southern Miss	L 62–68	16–15	FedExForum (11,258); Memphis, TN
*Non-conference game. Rankings from AP poll. All times are in Eastern Time.
