= 2007–08 Memphis Tigers men's basketball team =

American college basketball season

2007–08 Memphis Tigers men's basketball

NCAA tournament, Runner-up (vacated) C-USA tournament champions (vacated) C-USA regular season champions (vacated)

National Championship Game, L 68-75 ^{OT} vs. Kansas (vacated) ^{[Note A]}
- Conference: Conference USA

Ranking
- Coaches: No. 2
- AP: No. 2
- Record: 0–1 (38-2 unadjusted) ^{[Note A]} (0–0^{[Note A]} C-USA, 16 wins vacated)
- Head coach: John Calipari (8th year)
- Assistant coaches: Derek Kellogg; John Robic; Chuck Martin
- Home arena: FedExForum

2007–08 Conference USA men's basketball standings
	Conf.				Overall
Team	W		L	PCT	W		L	PCT
No. 2 Memphis	16	–	0	1.000	38	–	2	.950
UAB	12	–	4	.750	23	–	11	.676
Houston	11	–	5	.688	24	–	10	.706
Southern Miss	9	–	7	.563	19	–	14	.576
UCF	9	–	7	.563	16	–	15	.516
Tulsa	8	–	8	.500	25	–	14	.641
UTEP	8	–	8	.500	19	–	14	.576
Marshall	8	–	8	.500	16	–	14	.533
Tulane	6	–	10	.375	17	–	15	.531
East Carolina	5	–	11	.313	11	–	19	.367
SMU	4	–	12	.250	10	–	20	.333
Rice	0	–	16	.000	3	–	27	.100
† 2008 C-USA Tournament winner Rankings from AP Poll

The 2007–08 Memphis Tigers men's basketball team represented the University of Memphis in the 2007–08 college basketball season, the 87th season of Tiger basketball. The Tigers were coached by eighth-year head coach John Calipari, and they played their home games at the FedExForum in Memphis, Tennessee. The team was the most successful in Tigers' history reaching the NCAA Championship game for the second time and setting numerous school records. It is also one of the most successful in college basketball history, setting the record for most wins in a season at 38–2. However, all wins and one loss were vacated in 2009 after an investigation into the eligibility of Derrick Rose and the Tigers officially finished the season 0–1.

== Season summary ==
=== Non-conference play ===
The Tigers began the season ranked No. 3 as a result of a strong recruiting class led by Derrick Rose and returning veteran stars Chris Douglas-Roberts and Joey Dorsey. To start non-conference play, the Tigers defeated powerhouses Oklahoma and Connecticut in the 2K College Hoops Classic at Madison Square Garden in New York. On the same court in the Jimmy V Classic, they won an overtime thriller over USC led by O. J. Mayo. On December 22, they defeated No. 5 Georgetown by 14 and No. 17 Arizona the next week. On January 21, the undefeated Tigers were ranked No. 1 by both major polls after a loss by number-one North Carolina. The Tigers started the season 26–0, the best start to a season in Memphis history.

=== Conference play ===
Entering conference play, the Tigers were predicted to match the previous years undefeated run in the conference. Memphis started the season 26–0, the best in history. However, the record start was tested in a mid-season, non-conference bout against in-state rival No. 2 Tennessee. In a highly anticipated No. 1 vs. No. 2 matchup covered by ESPN Gameday, the Volunteers beat the top-ranked Tigers at home 66–62. The Tigers finished Conference USA play undefeated for the second straight year, and won the conference tournament for the third straight year. Memphis finished the season with a 38–1 record and became the Conference USA regular season champions.

=== NCAA tournament ===
In the NCAA tournament Memphis received the No. 1 seed in the South. In opening rounds in Little Rock, they defeated No. 16-seeded Texas–Arlington and 8-seed Mississippi State. They moved on to regionals in Houston where they defeated No. 5 seed Michigan State. In the regional final, they knocked off a No. 2-seeded Texas team playing near to its home in Austin. In the Final Four, Memphis beat UCLA and proceeded to the national championship game. The Tigers fell in overtime to Kansas, 75–68 after a game-tying three-pointer at the regulation buzzer by Kansas star Mario Chalmers.

Chris Douglas-Roberts was named a first-team All-American, and prospective number-one draft pick Derrick Rose was named to the third team. The Tigers finished the season 38–2 (16–0), as Conference USA regular season and tournament champions. The 38 wins broke a record shared by the 1986 Duke Blue Devils, 1987 UNLV Runnin' Rebels, and 2005 Illinois Fighting Illini for the most wins in NCAA Division I history. It would be matched later by the 2012 and 2015 Kentucky Wildcats.

=== NCAA investigation ===
The NCAA determined in 2009 that Derrick Rose had forfeited his eligibility because the Educational Testing Service voided Rose's SAT Reasoning Test score that made him eligible to play at Memphis. Additionally, the NCAA determined that even without the questions about Rose's SAT score, Rose would have lost his eligibility in December 2007 due to his brother being allowed to travel with the team for free. All 38 wins and one NCAA tournament loss were subsequently vacated by the NCAA for rules violations, leaving the team with an official record of 0–1. The NCAA also made Memphis remove banners commemorating the 2008 season. This included a banner commemorating three seniors who finished the season with the most wins by any player in NCAA history with 137 from 2005 to 2009. Memphis also forfeited all NCAA tournament revenues.

== Recruiting class ==
College recruiting information
Name	Hometown	School	Height	Weight	Commit date
Jeff Robinson; SF	Elizabeth, NJ	St. Patrick HS	6 ft 5 in (1.96 m)	195 lb (88 kg)	Jun 14, 2006
Jeff Robinson; SF	Recruit ratings: Scout: Rivals: (97)				
Derrick Rose; PG	Chicago, IL	Simeon Career Academy	6 ft 2 in (1.88 m)	180 lb (82 kg)	Nov 4, 2006
Derrick Rose; PG	Recruit ratings: Scout: Rivals: (98)				
Overall recruit ranking: Scout: 4 Rivals: 23
Note: In many cases, Scout, Rivals, 247Sports, On3, and ESPN may conflict in their listings of height and weight.; In these cases, the average was taken. ESPN grades are on a 100-point scale.; Sources: "Memphis Basketball Commitments". Rivals.; "2007 Memphis Basketball Commits". Scout.; "ESPN". ESPN.; "Scout.com Team Recruiting Rankings". Scout.; "2007 Team Ranking". Rivals.

== Roster ==
2007–08 Memphis Tigers men's basketball team
Players
Coaches

Pos.	#	Name	Height	Weight	Year	Hometown
F	0	Shawn Taggart	6 ft 10 in (2.08 m)	238 lb (108 kg)	So	Richmond, Virginia
G	4	Willie Kemp	6 ft 2 in (1.88 m)	184 lb (83 kg)	So	Bolivar, Tennessee
F	2	Robert Dozier	6 ft 9 in (2.06 m)	220 lb (100 kg)	Jr	Lithonia, Georgia
F	5	Antonio Anderson	6 ft 6 in (1.98 m)	214 lb (97 kg)	Jr	Lynn, Massachusetts
G	10	Chance McGrady	6 ft 2 in (1.88 m)	183 lb (83 kg)	Jr	Auburndale, Florida
G	20	Doneal Mack	6 ft 5 in (1.96 m)	187 lb (85 kg)	So	Charlotte, North Carolina
F	32	Jeff Robinson	6 ft 5 in (1.96 m)	230 lb (104 kg)	Fr	Columbus, New Jersey
G	23	Derrick Rose	6 ft 3 in (1.91 m)	190 lb (86 kg)	Fr	Chicago, Illinois
C	3	Joey Dorsey	6 ft 8 in (2.03 m)	268 lb (122 kg)	Sr	Baltimore, Maryland
G	14	Chris Douglas-Roberts	6 ft 7 in (2.01 m)	200 lb (91 kg)	Jr	Richmond, Virginia
G	15	Andre Allen	5 ft 10 in (1.78 m)	205 lb (93 kg)	Sr	Memphis, Tennessee
F	1	Pierre Niles	6 ft 8 in (2.03 m)	300 lb (136 kg)	So	Memphis, Tennessee
C	35	Hashim Bailey	6 ft 10 in (2.08 m)	275 lb (125 kg)	So	Paterson, New Jersey

Head coach

- John Calipari (Clarion)

Assistant coach(es)

- John Robic (Denison)

Legend

- (C) Team captain
- (S) Suspended
- (I) Ineligible
- (W) Walk-on
- Injured
- Current redshirt

Roster
Last update: 2019-02-05

== Schedule ==
Date time, TV	Rank^{#}	Opponent^{#}	Result	Record	Site (attendance) city, state
Regular season
11/05/07*; 6:00 pm, ESPNU	No. 3	Tennessee–Martin; 2K College Hoops Classic (Coaches vs. Cancer)	W 102–71	1–0	FedExForum (16,555); Memphis, TN
11/06/07*; 8:00 pm, ESPNU	No. 3	Richmond; 2K College Hoops Classic (Coaches vs. Cancer)	W 80–63	2–0	FedExForum (16,771); Memphis, TN
11/15/07*; 7:00 pm, ESPN2	No. 3	vs. Oklahoma; 2K College Hoops Classic (Coaches vs. Cancer)	W 63–53	3–0	Madison Square Garden (7,308); New York, NY
11/16/07*; 7:00 pm, ESPN2	No. 3	vs. Connecticut; 2K College Hoops Classic (Coaches vs. Cancer)	W 81–70	4–0	Madison Square Garden (8,895); New York, NY
11/20/07*; 7:00 pm, WLMT	No. 3	Arkansas State	W 84–63	5–0	FedExForum (16,741); Memphis, TN
11/27/07*; 7:00 pm, WLMT	No. 3	Austin Peay	W 104–82	6–0	FedExForum (16,987); Memphis, TN
12/04/07*; 8:00 pm, ESPN	No. 2	vs. USC; Jimmy V Classic	W 62–58 ^{OT}	7–0	Madison Square Garden (8,300); New York, NY
12/15/07*; 6:00 pm, ESPN2	No. 2	vs. MTSU	W 65–41	8–0	Sommet Center (18,071); Nashville, TN
12/19/07*; 6:00 pm, ESPN2	No. 2	at Cincinnati	W 79–69	9–0	Fifth Third Arena (8,254); Cincinnati, OH
12/22/07*; 11:00 am, ESPN	No. 2	No. 5 Georgetown	W 85–71	10–0	FedExForum (18,864); Memphis, TN
12/29/07*; 9:00 pm, ESPN2	No. 2	No. 17 Arizona	W 76–63	11–0	FedExForum (17,965); Memphis, TN
01/03/08*; 8:00 pm, CSS	No. 2	Siena	W 102–58	12–0	FedExForum (16,836); Memphis, TN
01/05/08*; 12:00 pm, WLMT	No. 2	Pepperdine	W 90–53	13–0	FedExForum (16,974); Memphis, TN
01/09/08; 7:00 pm, CSS	No. 2	East Carolina	W 99–58	14–0 (1–0)	FedExForum (17,308); Memphis, TN
01/12/08; 7:00 pm, CSS	No. 2	at Marshall	W 68–54	15–0 (2–0)	Cam Henderson Center (9,034); Huntington, WV
01/16/08; 7:00 pm, WLMT	No. 2	at Rice	W 77–50	16–0 (3–0)	Reliant Arena (1,892); Houston, TX
01/19/08; 8:00 pm, CSS	No. 2	Southern Miss	W 83–47	17–0 (4–0)	FedExForum (18,108); Memphis, TN
01/23/08; 7:00 pm, CSTV	No. 1	at Tulsa	W 56–41	18–0 (5–0)	Reynolds Center (8,475); Tulsa, OK
01/26/08*; 11:00 am, ESPN	No. 1	Gonzaga	W 81–73	19–0 (5–0)	FedExForum (18,152); Memphis, TN
01/30/08; 7:00 pm, CSTV	No. 1	at Houston	W 89–77	20–0 (6–0)	Hofheinz Pavilion (8,918); Houston, TX
02/02/08; 12:00 pm, CSS	No. 1	UTEP	W 70–64	21–0 (7–0)	FedExForum (17,722); Memphis, TN
02/06/08; 8:00 pm, CSS	No. 1	SMU	W 77–48	22–0 (8–0)	FedExForum (16,844); Memphis, TN
02/09/08; 3:00 pm, CSTV	No. 1	UCF	W 85–64	23–0 (9–0)	FedExForum (17,833); Memphis, TN
02/13/08; 8:00 pm, CSTV	No. 1	Houston	W 68–59	24–0 (10–0)	FedExForum (17,527); Memphis, TN
02/16/08; 7:00 pm, CSS	No. 1	at UAB	W 79–78	25–0 (11–0)	Bartow Arena (9,392); Birmingham, AL
02/20/08; 7:00 pm, CSTV	No. 1	at Tulane	W 97–71	26–0 (12–0)	Avron B. Fogelman Arena (3,795); New Orleans, LA
02/23/08*; 8:00 pm, ESPN	No. 1	No. 2 Tennessee; ESPN College GameDay	L 62–66	26–1 (12–0)	FedExForum (18,389); Memphis, TN
02/27/08; 7:00 pm, CSTV	No. 2	Tulsa	W 82–67	27–1 (13–0)	FedExForum (17,179); Memphis, TN
03/01/08; 3:00 pm, CSTV	No. 2	at Southern Miss	W 76–67	28–1 (14–0)	Reed Green Coliseum (8,129); Hattiesburg, MS
03/05/08; 7:00 pm, CSTV	No. 2	at SMU	W 72–55	29–1 (15–0)	Moody Coliseum (7,421); Dallas, TX
03/08/08; 12:00 pm, CSTV	No. 2	UAB; Battle for the Bones	W 94–56	30–1 (16–0)	FedExForum (17,822); Memphis, TN
Conference USA Tournament
03/13/08; 6:00 pm, CSTV	No. 2	vs. Tulane; Quarterfinals	W 75–56	31–1	FedExForum (NA); Memphis, TN
03/14/08; 3:30 pm, CSTV	No. 2	vs. Southern Miss; Semifinals	W 69–53	32–1	FedExForum (NA); Memphis, TN
03/15/08; 10:35 am, CBS	No. 2	vs. Tulsa; Championship	W 77–51	33–1	FedExForum (14,071); Memphis, TN
2008 NCAA tournament
03/21/08*; 8:55 pm, CBS	(1 S) No. 2	vs. (16 S) Texas–Arlington; First Round	W 87–63	34–1	Alltel Arena (16,060); North Little Rock, AR
03/23/08*; 3:45 pm, CBS	(1 S) No. 2	vs. (8 S) Mississippi State; Second Round	W 77–74	35–1	Alltel Arena (16,060); North Little Rock, AR
03/28/08*; 8:57 pm, CBS	(1 S) No. 2	vs. (5 S) No. 18 Michigan State; Sweet Sixteen	W 92–74	36–1	Reliant Stadium (32,931); Houston, TX
03/30/08*; 1:20 pm, CBS	(1 S) No. 2	vs. (2 S) No. 7 Texas; Elite Eight	W 85–67	37–1	Reliant Stadium (32,798); Houston, TX
04/05/08*; 5:07 pm, CBS	(1 S) No. 2	vs. (1 W) No. 3 UCLA; Final Four	W 78–63	38–1	Alamodome (43,718); San Antonio, TX
04/07/08*; 8:21 pm, CBS	(1 S) No. 2	vs. (1 MW) No. 4 Kansas; National Championship Game	L 68–75 ^{OT}	38-2	Alamodome (43,257); San Antonio, TX
*Non-conference game. (#) Tournament seedings in parentheses. All times are in Central Time.

== See also ==
- List of vacated and forfeited games in college basketball

== Notes ==
^A. Due to NCAA sanctions, Memphis had 33 regular season wins, 5 tournament wins and 1 tournament loss vacated from the 2007–08 season. The team's pre-sanctions record was 38–2. The "official" record therefore stands as 0-1.
