= 2007–08 UTEP Miners men's basketball team =

American college basketball season

2007–08 UTEP Miners men's basketball
- Conference: Conference USA
- Record: 19–14 (8–8 C-USA)
- Head coach: Tony Barbee (2nd season)
- Assistant coaches: Randall Dickey; Tony Madlock; Milt Wagner
- Home arena: Don Haskins Center

2007–08 Conference USA men's basketball standings
	Conf.				Overall
Team	W		L	PCT	W		L	PCT
No. 2 Memphis	16	–	0	1.000	38	–	2	.950
UAB	12	–	4	.750	23	–	11	.676
Houston	11	–	5	.688	24	–	10	.706
Southern Miss	9	–	7	.563	19	–	14	.576
UCF	9	–	7	.563	16	–	15	.516
Tulsa	8	–	8	.500	25	–	14	.641
UTEP	8	–	8	.500	19	–	14	.576
Marshall	8	–	8	.500	16	–	14	.533
Tulane	6	–	10	.375	17	–	15	.531
East Carolina	5	–	11	.313	11	–	19	.367
SMU	4	–	12	.250	10	–	20	.333
Rice	0	–	16	.000	3	–	27	.100
† 2008 C-USA Tournament winner Rankings from AP Poll

The 2007–08 UTEP Miners men's basketball team represented the University of Texas at El Paso in the 2007–08 college basketball season. The team was led by second-year head coach Tony Barbee. In 2006–07, the Miners finished 14–17 (6–10 in C-USA). UTEP averaged 8,145 fans per game, ranking 67th nationally.
