= Derrick Rose =

American basketball player (born 1988)

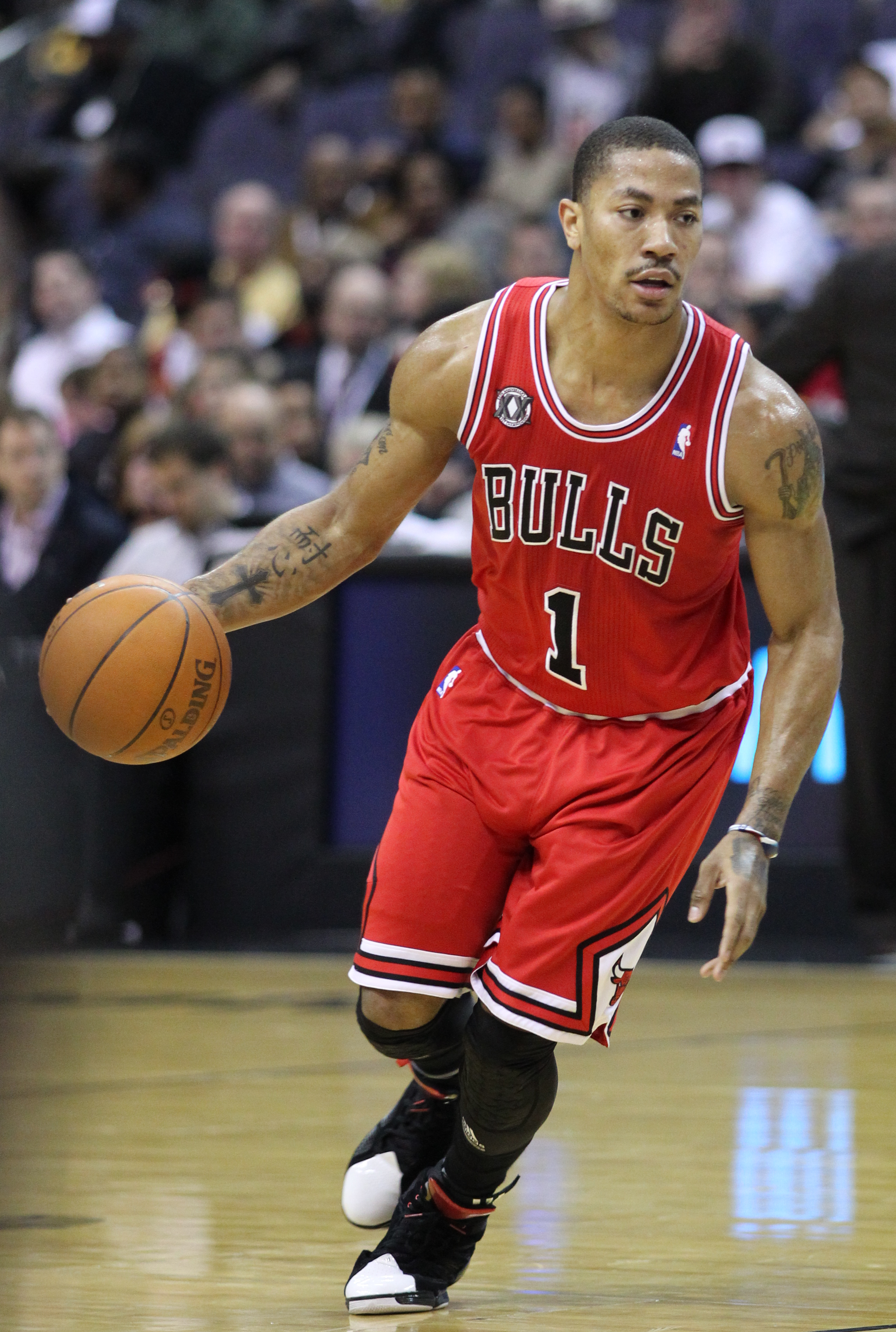
- Rose with the Chicago Bulls in 2011

Personal information
- Born: October 4, 1988 (age 38) Chicago, Illinois, U.S.
- Listed height: 6 ft 3 in (1.91 m)
- Listed weight: 200 lb (91 kg)

Career information
- High school: Simeon Career Academy (Chicago, Illinois)
- College: Memphis (2007–2008)
- NBA draft: 2008: 1st round, 1st overall pick
- Drafted by: Chicago Bulls
- Playing career: 2008–2024
- Position: Point guard / shooting guard
- Number: 1, 25, 4, 23

Career history
- 2008–2016: Chicago Bulls
- 2016–2017: New York Knicks
- 2017–2018: Cleveland Cavaliers
- 2018–2019: Minnesota Timberwolves
- 2019–2021: Detroit Pistons
- 2021–2023: New York Knicks
- 2023–2024: Memphis Grizzlies

Career highlights
- NBA Most Valuable Player (2011); 3× NBA All-Star (2010–2012); All-NBA First Team (2011); NBA Rookie of the Year (2009); NBA All-Rookie First Team (2009); No. 1 retired by Chicago Bulls; Third-team All-American – AP, NABC (2008); First-team Parade All-American (2007); Third-team Parade All-American (2005); Fourth-team Parade All-American (2006); McDonald's All-American (2007); Illinois Mr. Basketball (2007)

Career NBA statistics
- Points: 12,573 (17.4 ppg)
- Rebounds: 2,324 (3.2 rpg)
- Assists: 3,770 (5.2 apg)
- Stats at NBA.com
- Stats at Basketball Reference
Medals
Men's basketball
Representing United States
FIBA World Cup
Gold medal – first place	2010 Turkey	Team
Gold medal – first place	2014 Spain	Team

Derrick Martell Rose (born October 4, 1988) is an American former professional basketball player. He played one year of college basketball for the Memphis Tigers before being drafted first overall by his hometown Chicago Bulls in the 2008 NBA draft. Nicknamed "D-Rose", and sometimes referred to as "the Windy City Assassin" or "Pooh", he was named the NBA Rookie of the Year in 2009 and became the youngest player to win the NBA Most Valuable Player Award in 2011 at the age of 22 years and 7 months.

Rose was born and raised in Chicago, and attended Simeon Career Academy. He was highly recruited by colleges, eventually choosing to join the University of Memphis under coach John Calipari. Rose led the Tigers to the most wins in NCAA history (a 38–2 record), their first number 1 ranking in 25 years, and an appearance in the NCAA championship game. In 2009, an NCAA investigation revealed that Rose's SAT scores had been invalidated, and as a result, the NCAA vacated Memphis' entire 2007–08 season.

Rose struggled with significant knee injuries throughout his career. In the first round of the 2012 NBA playoffs against the Philadelphia 76ers, Rose tore his ACL in his left knee. He required surgery and was subsequently sidelined for the entire 2012–13 season. Rose returned to play in 2013–14, but in November 2013, he injured his right meniscus, causing him to miss the remainder of the season. He returned once again the following season, but knee injuries continued to impact his availability and production.

In June 2016, Rose was traded to the New York Knicks, where he finished the final year of his contract. He signed with the Cleveland Cavaliers on a minimum salary for the 2017–18 season but was hobbled by ankle injuries, which led to him being traded to, and subsequently waived by, the Utah Jazz in February 2018. He signed with the Minnesota Timberwolves a month later on a rest-of-season contract; he stayed with the team through the following season and enjoyed a revived role as a sixth man. For the 2019–20 season, the Detroit Pistons signed Rose to his first non-minimum salary contract since 2017, and he continued to be successful off the bench. The following season, he was reunited with his former coach Tom Thibodeau when the Knicks re-acquired him in a trade. In July 2023, Rose signed for the Memphis Grizzlies in free agency. In September 2024, Rose was released by the Grizzlies, and subsequently announced his retirement.

== Early life ==
Rose was born on Chicago’s South Side and grew up in the Englewood neighborhood. He is the youngest son of Brenda Rose after Dwayne, Reggie, and Allan. All three were talented basketball players who taught Rose the ins and outs of basketball on nearby courts. As his talent for the sport grew, Rose began to attract outside attention, leading his mother and brothers to restrict outside contact to him. His mother feared he would be exploited and have his path to the NBA diverted by outside parties like street agents, similar to what happened to former Chicago prospect Ronnie Fields.

== High school career ==
By the time Rose enrolled at Simeon Career Academy in 2003, he was widely noticed by collegiate coaches. Despite his reputation, he played freshmen and JV basketball for the Wolverines. He wore No. 25 in honor of Ben "Benji" Wilson, a promising player who was murdered by a gang member during his senior year in 1984. Rose was not allowed on varsity due to a long-standing tradition that head coach Bob Hambric, who had been with the school since 1980 had no freshmen on the varsity team. That rule did not lessen Rose's play, and he went on to put up 18.5 points, 6.6 assists, 4.7 rebounds and 2.1 steals per game and led both the freshmen and sophomores to city championships with a 24–1 record. Hambric softened his stance and allowed the freshman a chance to play on varsity in the state tournament, but Rose declined, wanting the players to get due credit. The next year Hambric retired and Robert Smith was hired, opening the path to varsity. In Rose's debut, he had 22 points, 7 rebounds and 5 steals over Thornwood High School in a sold-out game filled with college scouts and coaches. He led the Wolverines to a 30–5 mark while averaging 19.8 points, 5.1 rebounds, 8.3 assists and 2.4 steals but the season ended after a loss in state regionals. Rose's play garnered him his first national award: a Parade All-American third team spot.

During Rose's junior year in 2006, the Simeon Wolverines broke through and won the Chicago Public League championship held at the United Center, where Rose starred with 25 points and crowd pleasing dunks. The team advanced through the playoffs and earned a berth in the Class AA state championship against Richwoods High School, where a fourth quarter buzzer beater by Richwood forced overtime. The score was knotted at 29 late in the extra period when Rose stole the ball and buried the game winning jumper as time expired, giving Simeon its first state title since the Wilson-led Wolverines won in 1984. The team finished 33–4 and ranked nationally, and Rose was awarded with an All-State Illinois mention, EA Sports All-American Second Team pick and another Parade All-American selection.

Entering his senior year, Rose was ranked the fifth best prospect in the nation by Sports Illustrated. In January 2007, Simeon traveled to Madison Square Garden to play Rice High School and star guard Kemba Walker. The Wolverines lost 53–51. The season's highlight was a nationally televised contest on ESPN against Virginia perennial power Oak Hill Academy two weeks later. Matched up with hyped junior guard Brandon Jennings, Rose had 28 points, 9 assists, and 8 rebounds and in a 78–75 win. For his performance, USA Today named him their high school player of the week. Simeon went on to repeat as Public League champions and defended their state championship, defeating O'Fallon High School 77–54. In doing so, Simeon became the first Chicago Public League school to win two straight state championships. In his final high school game, Rose scored 2 points, but pulled down 7 rebounds and totaled 8 assists, while Simeon big man Tim Flowers scored 35 points. The Wolverines ended the season 33–2 and ranked first in the nation by Sports Illustrated and 6th on USA Today's Super 25. Rose averaged 25.2 points, 9.1 assists, 8.8 rebounds and 3.4 steals.

Overall, Simeon's record while Rose played was 120–12. After his senior year, Rose was again All-State after being named Illinois Mr. Basketball and was named to the McDonald's All-American team. He was also awarded with First Team honors by Parade selection and USA Today and USA Today First Team All-American.

Rose was selected to play in the Jordan Brand All-Star Game and Nike Hoop Summit. In 2009, Rose was named the decade's third greatest high school point guard by ESPN RISE magazine behind Chris Paul and T. J. Ford, and had his jersey number (#25) retired along with Ben Wilson.

== College career ==
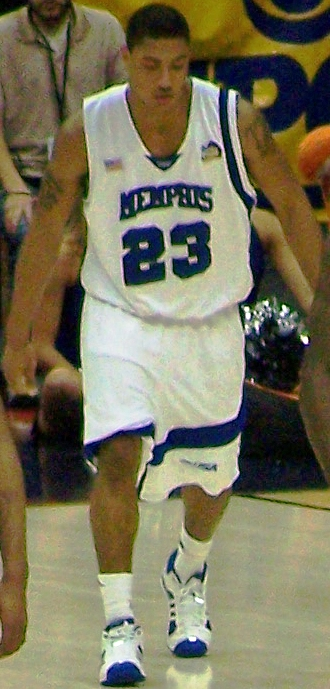
Rose while playing at the University of Memphis

Rose accepted a scholarship to play for the University of Memphis Tigers under John Calipari, who recruited him after seeing him play in an AAU game. Strong efforts were made by Indiana University and in-state University of Illinois to sign Rose to their own programs. Illinois in particular planned to pair Rose and their five-star recruit Eric Gordon, who had played AAU basketball with Rose. Gordon, however, retracted his verbal commitment from the Fighting Illini, opting to play for Indiana, and Rose subsequently gave his verbal commitment before the start of his senior season. Rose chose Memphis because of the school's history of putting players in the NBA and the prospect of Rod Strickland, a 17-year veteran of the league, mentoring him. Rose switched to #23, due to the fact that #25 had been retired by the school in honor of Penny Hardaway.

With the addition of Rose and led by veteran upperclassmen Joey Dorsey and Chris Douglas-Roberts, the Tigers started out the season ranked third in the nation. Memphis sprinted to a 26–0 start and claimed the number one ranking in the country for the first time in over 25 years before falling to the University of Tennessee Volunteers 66–62 in February. Memphis was able to bounce back and capture the Conference USA tournament to qualify for the "Big Dance" with a 33–1 record. Rose averaged 14.9 points per game, 4.7 assists and 4.5 rebounds per game during the regular season and earned All-American Third Team honors among others. He finished as a finalist for the Bob Cousy Award as well as the John R. Wooden Award.

Memphis was seeded No. 1 in the South Region. Rose earned high praise for his increased focus on defense, hounding Texas Longhorn guard D. J. Augustin into a low-percentage game in the Elite Eight. In a match-up against UCLA in the Final Four, Rose finished with 25 points and 9 rebounds to lead the Tigers to an 85–67 win and a trip to the NCAA championship game against the Kansas Jayhawks. The win set an NCAA mark for most wins in a season (38). Against Kansas, Rose scored 17 points on 7–of–17 shooting, along with six rebounds and seven assists, but missed a critical free throw at the end of the second half as Memphis fell in overtime, 75–68. Memphis concluded the season 38–2. Rose was named to the All-Final Four team after averaging 20.8 points, 6.5 rebounds and 6.0 assists per game.

On April 15, Rose announced he would forgo his final three seasons at Memphis and declared for the 2008 NBA draft.

=== Grading controversy ===
According to Sheri Lipman of the University of Memphis legal counsel, a month after the loss to Kansas, the NCAA sent a letter to the school stating that Rose had "an invalidated standardized test score the previous year at Chicago's Simeon High School." The next January, the NCAA sent another letter, charging Memphis with knowing that Rose had someone else take his SAT for him. Memphis started its own investigation and sent its response back on April 24.

On May 28, 2009, the Memphis Commercial Appeal obtained the letter through the Freedom of Information Act and released it. Although the player's name was redacted due to privacy laws, process of elimination and sources revealed the player as Derrick Rose. The next day, in a separate investigation, James Sullivan, Inspector General of the Chicago Public Schools district's Board of Education, released a report of his investigation stating that four student-athletes of a CPS school had one-month grade boosts to alter their college transcripts. The Chicago Sun-Times revealed the school as Simeon Career Academy and that three of the four were Rose and his former teammates Kevin Johnson and Tim Flowers, prominent members of the back-to-back championship teams. The newspaper claimed that Rose's grade was changed from a D to a C. Another part of the report stated that "high school staff lost the original permanent records for three of the above mentioned students athletes" (including the unknown four). Sullivan started the investigation because "none of the grade changes were supported by any documentation." He also failed to find a suspect as "at least seven people at Simeon had the ability to access student grades and records." Illinois High School Association (IHSA) executive director Marty Hickman reacted by saying, "It is obvious that this is worth taking a look into." Robert Smith, who coached the Wolverines from 2004 to 2007, denied any wrongdoing. District spokeswoman Monique Bond said the students involved probably did not know about the grade change.

Allegations surfaced that Rose's brother, Reggie, had been allowed to travel with the team for free on several occasions.

Memphis contended that it had learned of the allegations about Rose's SAT score shortly after he enrolled at the school. It conducted its own investigation, in which Rose was questioned by four school officials. Ultimately, Memphis was unable to find any evidence that Rose had cheated based on what was available at the time and cleared him to play.

Rose released a statement through his lawyer Daniel E. Reidy: "Mr. Rose is aware of the allegations reported in the press. Mr. Rose cooperated fully with the University of Memphis' athletic and legal departments’ investigation of this issue when he was a student, and that investigation uncovered no wrongdoing on his part."

On August 20, 2009, the NCAA vacated Memphis' 2007–08 season. It took the position that because the Educational Testing Service voided Rose's SAT score after Rose's freshman year at Memphis, strict liability required that Rose be retroactively declared ineligible. It also determined that even without the questions about his test score, Rose would have lost his eligibility in December 2007 due to Reggie Rose being allowed to travel for free.

On May 28, 2010, Rose, former Memphis basketball coach John Calipari, and Memphis athletic director R.C. Johnson reached a $100,000 out-of-court settlement with three attorneys who represented Memphis season ticket holders and threatened a lawsuit over the vacated 2007–08 season. The Memphis Commercial Appeal first reported on this settlement in October 2011.

== Professional career ==
=== Chicago Bulls (2008–2016) ===
==== 2008–09 season: Rookie of the Year ====
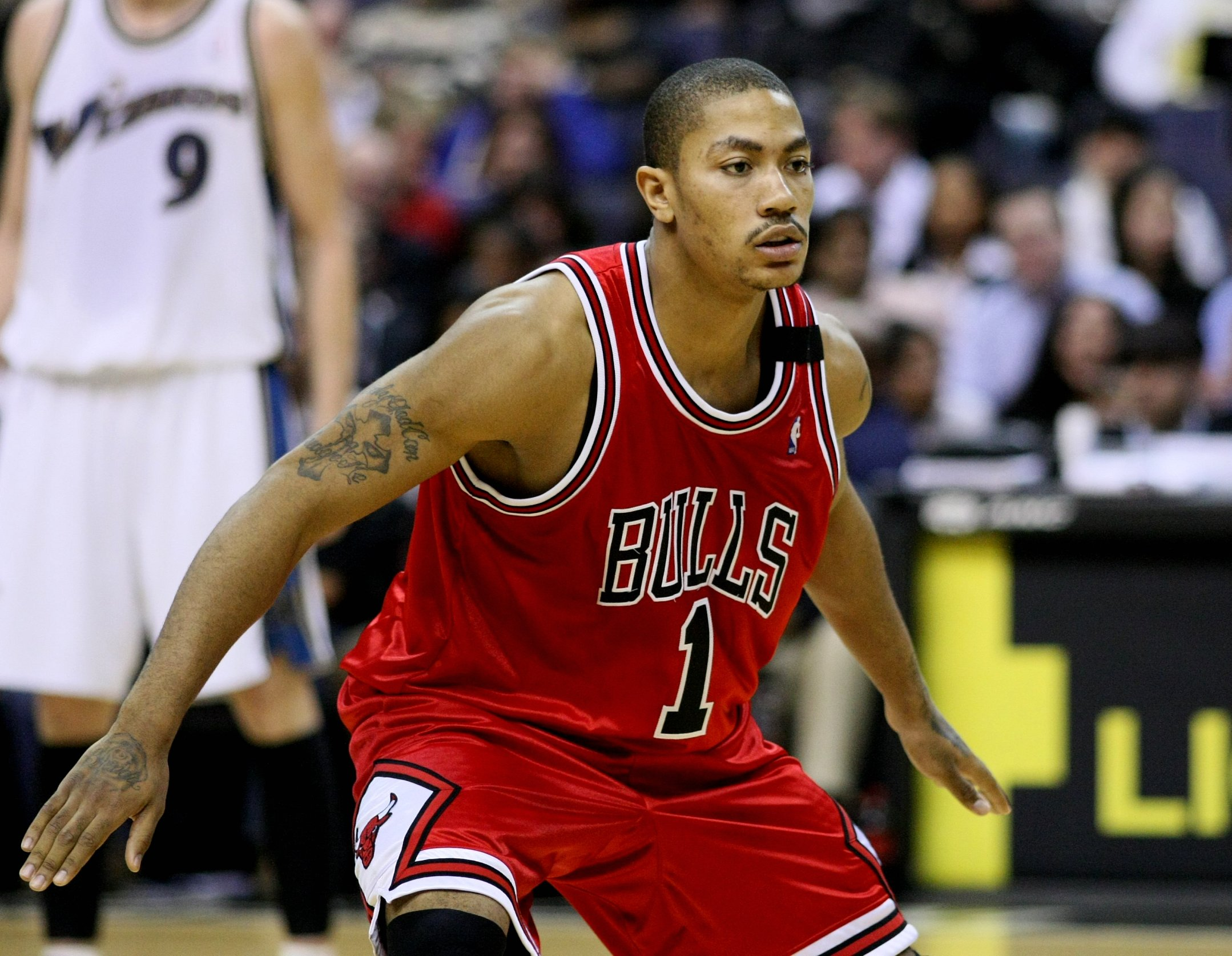
Derrick Rose during his rookie season

Rose was selected with the first overall pick in the 2008 draft by the Chicago Bulls. He was selected to the U.S. Select Team to scrimmage against and prepare the National Team for the Olympics in Beijing. In mid-July, he played two games in the Orlando Pro Summer League until forced out by tendinitis in his right knee, ending his summer, but returned in October to play all eight preseason games.

Rose became the first Bulls draftee to score 10 points or more in his first 10 games since Michael Jordan, and earned Eastern Conference Rookie of the Month honors for November and December. During the All-Star Weekend, Rose played in the Rookie Challenge, and won the Skills Challenge, where he beat out several All-Stars to become the first rookie to claim the trophy. Overcoming a January and February slump, Rose returned to form and won monthly rookie honors in March. Meanwhile, the Bulls, re-energized by the trade deadline acquisitions of John Salmons and Brad Miller, finished the regular season on a 12–4 spurt to qualify as the seventh seed in the Eastern Conference. Rose won Rookie of the Year, joining Jordan (1985) and Elton Brand (2000) as the only Bulls to do so. He was also the first number-one draft pick since LeBron James to win the award. He averaged 16.8 points on 47.5% field goal shooting, 6.3 assists (leading all rookies) and 3.9 rebounds per game and was also named to the NBA All-Rookie First Team.

In his playoff debut against the defending champion Boston Celtics, Rose recorded 36 points (tying Kareem Abdul-Jabbar's NBA record for points scored by a rookie in his playoff debut, set in 1970), 11 assists, and 4 rebounds as the Bulls prevailed in a 105–103 overtime win on the road. Rose became the second player in NBA history to record 35 points and 10 assists in his playoff debut, after Chris Paul. Rose averaged 19.7 points on 47.5% shooting, 6.3 assists and 4.9 rebounds per game in his first playoff series, as the Bulls were defeated by the Celtics in seven games.

==== 2009–10 season: First All-Star selection ====
Rose's sophomore season started off with an ankle injury in his first preseason game. Rose would go on to miss the rest of the preseason. Rose started the Bulls' season opener against the San Antonio Spurs but played limited minutes. Rose's ankle bothered him for most of November, but as his ankle healed, his game improved. On January 16, 2010, against the Washington Wizards, Rose recorded 37 points, including a layup to win the game 121–119 with 5.4 seconds to go in the second overtime. On January 28, Rose was elected to his first career All-Star Game as a reserve for the Eastern Conference, making him the first Bulls player to be selected since Michael Jordan in 1998. Rose ended up with eight points, four assists and three steals in the game. On April 13, 2010, Rose scored 39 points against the Boston Celtics, making 15–22 field goals and 9–10 free throws. The Bulls once again made the playoffs in the 2009–10 season, finishing with a 41–41 record. In the playoffs Rose averaged 26.8 points and 7.2 assists, but the Bulls lost in five games to the Cleveland Cavaliers.

==== 2010–11 season: MVP season ====
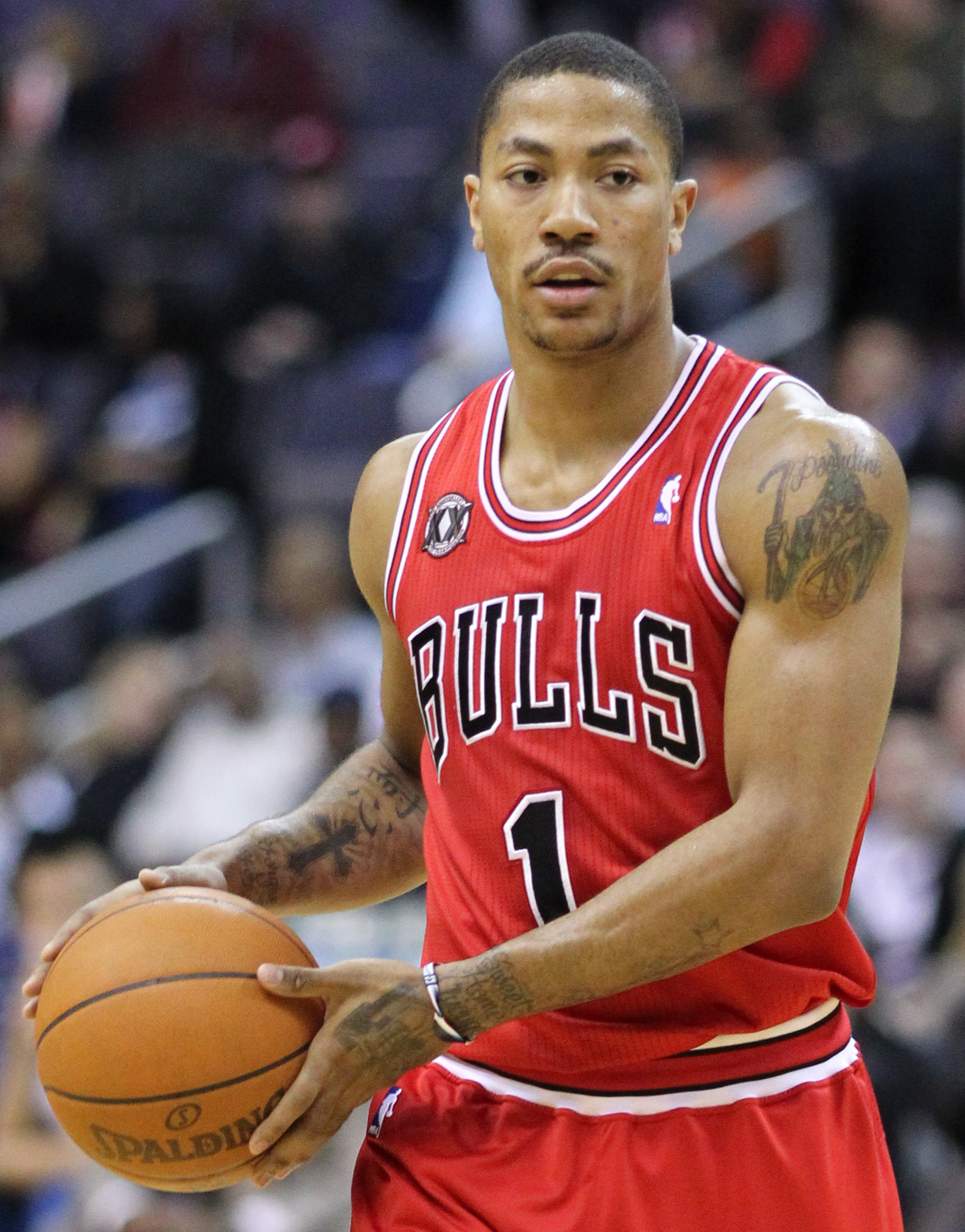
Rose led the Bulls to 62 wins, and the best record overall, during the 2010–11 NBA season.

On October 30, 2010, in the Bulls' second game of the season, Rose scored 39 points in a 101–91 win against the Detroit Pistons. Two days after, Rose contributed 13 assists, helping Luol Deng score a career-high 40 points in a win against the Portland Trail Blazers. On December 10, Rose scored 29 points and had 9 assists, leading the Bulls to their first victory over the Los Angeles Lakers since December 19, 2006. On January 16, 2011, Rose outdueled fellow Chicago native Dwyane Wade in a 99–96 win over the Miami Heat, scoring 34 points, of which 11 in the fourth quarter. On January 17, he recorded his first career triple-double with 22 points, 10 rebounds and 12 assists in a 96–84 win over the Memphis Grizzlies. On January 27, Rose was announced as a starting guard on the 2011 NBA All-Star Team for the East squad.

On February 17, in the Bulls' last game before the All-Star break, Rose set a career-high with 42 points, while also recording 8 assists and 5 rebounds, as the Bulls beat the San Antonio Spurs 109–99. On March 19, he equalled that tally in a 115–108 overtime loss by the Indiana Pacers. The loss was only one of two that the Bulls suffered in the last 23 games of the season. On March 26, Rose had a career-high 17 assists, along with 30 points, in a 95–87 victory over the Milwaukee Bucks. On April 10, Rose scored 39 points on 13-of-17 shooting in a 102–99 win over the Orlando Magic, in one of the final regular season matches of the season which saw the Bulls go undefeated in the month of April. On April 13, Rose put on a show at the Madison Square Garden with 26 points, shooting 10-of-19 and throwing down several crowd-pleasing dunks in a 103–90 win over the Knicks, leading coach Mike D'Antoni to compliment him in the post-game interview: "His athletic ability is ridiculous. He's come farther, quicker, faster than anyone expected; he's playing at a level that not many people play."

At the end of the 2010–11 NBA season the Bulls finished with a league leading record of 62–20. Their 60+ wins was the Bulls' first such season since 1997–98 and sixth 60+ win in franchise history. At season's end, Rose became only the third player since the 1972–73 NBA season to record 2,000 points and 600 assists in a single season. The other two players were LeBron James and Michael Jordan. On May 3, Rose was named the NBA Most Valuable Player, joining Jordan as the only players to receive the award in Chicago Bulls history. At 22 years and 6 months old, Rose also became the youngest player to receive the award (Wes Unseld, formerly the youngest MVP, won the award in 1968–69 at age 23 years, 2 months).

In the 2011 NBA playoffs, the Bulls defeated the Indiana Pacers and Atlanta Hawks in the first two rounds. In the Eastern Conference Finals, the Bulls faced the Miami Heat, led by James, Dwyane Wade and Chris Bosh. The Bulls lost the series in five games. During the 2011 playoffs, Rose averaged 27.1 points per game, but only shot 39% from the field and 24% for three-pointers.

==== 2011–12 season: ACL tear ====
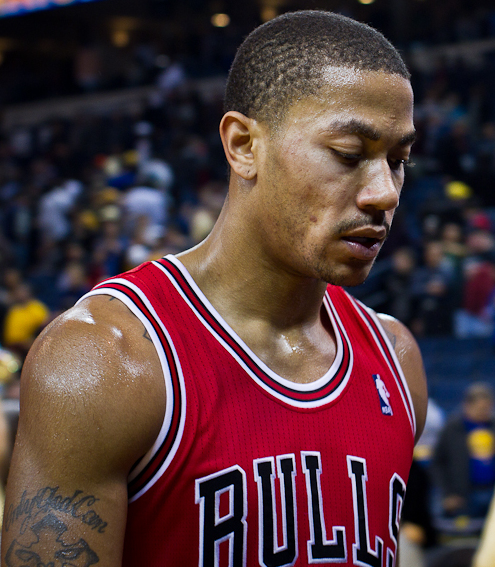
Rose in 2011

In December 2011, Rose signed a five-year contract extension with the Bulls for $94.8 million. The contract was 30 percent of the Bulls' salary cap, the maximum allowed under a rule dubbed the "Derrick Rose Rule" from the 2011 NBA Collective Bargaining Agreement. On December 25, in the Christmas Day matchup against the Los Angeles Lakers, Rose scored 22 points on 9-from-13 shooting, and hit a game winning floater with 4.8 seconds left to secure an 88–87 win for the Bulls.

On January 11, 2012, Rose had a double-double in a 111–100 win over the Minnesota Timberwolves, scoring 31 points (of which 14 on 6-of-7 shooting in the first quarter) and dishing 11 assists in a much-anticipated battle with young Spanish guard Ricky Rubio. On January 30, against the Eastern Conference rival Miami Heat, Rose scored 34 points, but missed two key free throws with 22 seconds left, and then had a jumper bounce off the rim with three seconds on the clock, resulting with a 97–93 loss for the Bulls. However, he bounced back the next day, scoring a season-high 35 points in a 98–88 win over the Washingtons Wizards, with coach Tom Thibodeau stating after the game that Rose "imposes his will on everybody". In February 2012, Rose was voted as an All-Star Game starter for the second consecutive year. He was the second leading vote getter behind Orlando Magic center Dwight Howard.

On March 5, 2012, Rose tied his season-high with 35 points against the Philadelphia 76ers, including a basket with 20 seconds left to seal a 96–91 win. Philadelphia coach Doug Collins tried to have defensive specialists Jrue Holiday, Andre Iguodala and Evan Turner take turns guarding Rose, but to little effect, as he hit a series of spectacular shots and added eight assists to announce his return to MVP form. On March 7, Rose confirmed his clutch reputation as he hit a step back fadeaway jumper to beat the buzzer against the Milwaukee Bucks, handing the Bulls a 106–104 win. He recorded another double-double with 30 points and 11 assists. The Bulls ended the season on a high, winning 18 out of their last 20 games, as Rose averaged 21.8 points per game, along with a career-high 7.9 assists in 35.3 minutes per game. Despite having played a career low 39 games due to injuries, Rose managed to record nine double-doubles. He also helped Luol Deng become an All-Star for the first time in his career.

During Game 1 of the first round of the playoffs against the Philadelphia 76ers, Rose injured his left knee while trying to jump. He was immediately helped off the court. The injury occurred when the Bulls were leading by 12 points with 1:22 left to play. Rose came up just short of a triple-double, finishing with 23 points, 9 assists, and 9 rebounds in 37 minutes of action. An MRI later revealed that Rose tore the ACL in his left knee and would miss the rest of the playoffs. Rose had surgery performed on May 12, 2012, with an estimated recovery period of 8–12 months.

==== 2012–13 season: Year absence ====
Rose returned to full contact practice in January 2013, and was cleared by doctors to play in March, but he did not appear in a game during the 2012–13 NBA season. He was heavily criticized by Bulls fans for his decision to sit out the season, but maintained that he must listen to his body and will only return when he's 100 percent healed. Despite Rose's absence, the Bulls advanced to the Eastern Conference Semifinals, where they lost to the eventual champions, the Miami Heat.

==== 2013–14 season: Return and torn meniscus ====
Rose's much awaited return came on October 5, 2013, in a pre-season game against the Indiana Pacers. He had a slow start but scored his first point in the first quarter. He finished the game with 13 points in 20 minutes of play. On October 16, 2013, Rose returned to play in Chicago for the first time, scoring 22 points against the Detroit Pistons. "I think I'm way more explosive now. Like getting to the rim. I think I can take contact a little bit better. And as far as jumping-wise, I think I can jump even higher. They tested my vertical — I increased it by 5 inches," Rose said after the win. During the pre-season, Rose averaged 20.7 points and 5.0 assists.

His first official game was in 107–95 loss against the defending champions Miami Heat on October 29. Rose was limited to 12 points, while having four assists in 34 minutes of play. He played his usual minutes, but was inefficient from the field, shooting 4–15. Two days later, he played his first official home game against the New York Knicks where he hit the game-winning floater in an 82–81 win. He had 18 points, six rebounds and 3 assists. On November 3, 2013, Rose scored 13 points and committed 8 turnovers in the loss against the Philadelphia 76ers. He struggled in his return, shooting 28.8% from the field and averaging 5.7 turnovers in his first three games.

On November 22, Rose injured his right knee during a game against the Portland Trail Blazers. An MRI the next day confirmed that Rose tore his right knee meniscus and that surgery was required. At the time, Rose was averaging 15.9 points and 4.3 assists in 31.1 minutes per game. On November 25, Rose underwent surgery on the torn meniscus in his right knee. The same day, the Bulls announced Rose was out for the season, after a successful surgery.

==== 2014–15 season: Back to the playoffs ====
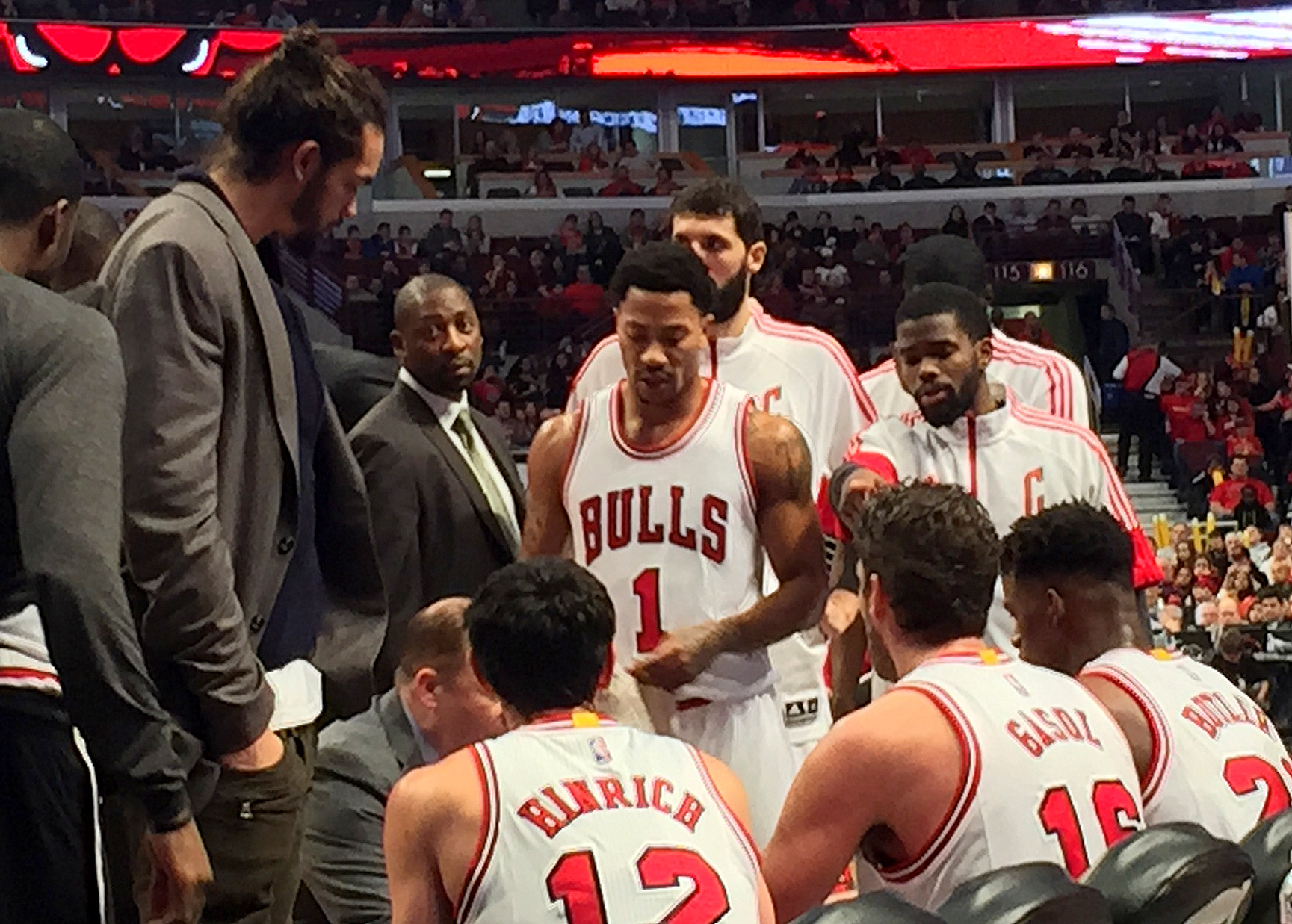
Rose during a timeout in 2015

Rose returned from injury to play in the Bulls' season opener against the New York Knicks on October 29, 2014, and recorded 13 points and five assists in 21 minutes of action. He went on to score a season-high 32 points on January 14, 2015, against the Washington Wizards. On January 28, Rose scored a step-back jumper with seven seconds on the clock to give the Bulls a 113–111 overtime win over the Golden State Warriors; however he only made 13 out of 33 shots from the field, and had a career-high 11 turnovers. Two weeks later Rose was ruled out again with another knee injury.

On February 24, it was announced Rose required another round of surgery on his right knee and was ruled out indefinitely. An exam and subsequent MRI confirmed a medial meniscus tear of the right knee, the same injury he sustained on November 22, 2013, against the Portland Trail Blazers. On February 27, he was deemed a possibility of returning toward the end of the season after he underwent successful surgery and was ruled out for just four to six weeks. Rose returned to action on April 8 after a 20-game absence, and working on a minutes restriction, he was 3-of-9 from the field and finished with nine points in 19 minutes as the Bulls lost to the Orlando Magic. He appeared in 51 games, the most he'd played since the 2010–11 season.

On April 18, 2015, Rose played in his first playoff game since Game 1 of the 2012 playoffs (the game where he tore his left ACL). Rose finished with 23 points and seven assists on 9-of-16 shooting. He had a vintage performance in Game 3 in which he scored 34 points, making five three-pointers from nine attempts and adding eight assists in a tight 113–106 win in overtime, helping his team to a 3–0 lead against the Milwaukee Bucks. During the Bulls' first round series against the Bucks, Rose averaged 21.5 points per game. On May 8, Rose banked in a three-pointer at the buzzer and scored 30 points to give the Bulls a 99–96 victory over the Cleveland Cavaliers and a 2–1 lead in the Eastern Conference semi-finals. He followed up that performance by recording 31 points in Game 4, including a contested layup to tie the game at 84–84; however, after the referees failed to award a technical foul to Cavaliers coach David Blatt for attempting to call a timeout without having any remaining, LeBron James hit a jumper from the corner in the last second to win the game 86–84 and tie the series 2–2. After the deflating loss, the Bulls were not able to stop the Cavaliers, who won the final two games to take the series in six games.

==== 2015–16 season: Final season with the Bulls ====
A preseason left orbital bone fracture saw Rose begin the regular season wearing a face mask. On November 5, 2015, Rose scored a then season-high 29 points on 12-of-25 shooting in a 104–98 win over the Oklahoma City Thunder. He showed signs of his old MVP ability as he scored 10 points over the final three and a half minutes to lift the Bulls after they blew a 10-point lead in the fourth quarter. On December 18, he scored a season-high 34 points in a 147–144 quadruple overtime loss to the Detroit Pistons. On February 5, 2016, he had a season-best game with 30 points, 9 rebounds and 8 assists in a 115–110 loss to the Denver Nuggets. On February 19, in a rematch of the previous playoffs' Eastern Conference semi-finals, Rose won the individual matchup against Cleveland Cavaliers point guard Kyrie Irving, scoring 28 points to Irving's 19, but the Cavaliers prevailed 106–95 over the Bulls. On February 22, Rose spoiled Kobe Bryant's farewell tour in his final season as an NBA player, as he led the Bulls in scoring with 24 points in a 126–115 win over the Lakers in Bryant's last game at the United Center. On March 25, Rose again dazzled the Madison Square Garden, scoring 30 points with a variety of acrobatic finishes and circus shots; however the Bulls lost 106–94 against the Knicks.

The season ended with a disappointment for the Bulls, as they didn't reach the playoffs for the first time since 2008, leading to a change in direction for the franchise. While Rose averaged a respectable 16.4 points and 4.7 assists per game in 66 games, the decline of his production, efficiency and on-court impact indicated that he was no longer capable of performing at same level as his pre-injury MVP self. Journalist A.J. Neuharth-Keutsch asserted for USA Today that Rose "struggled to find the explosiveness, confidence and versatility that he once possessed", while ESPN's Nick Friedell lamented that "whatever the reason, Rose evolved into a different player - glimpses of brilliance were still there on certain nights, but the virtuoso performances were not".

=== New York Knicks (2016–2017) ===
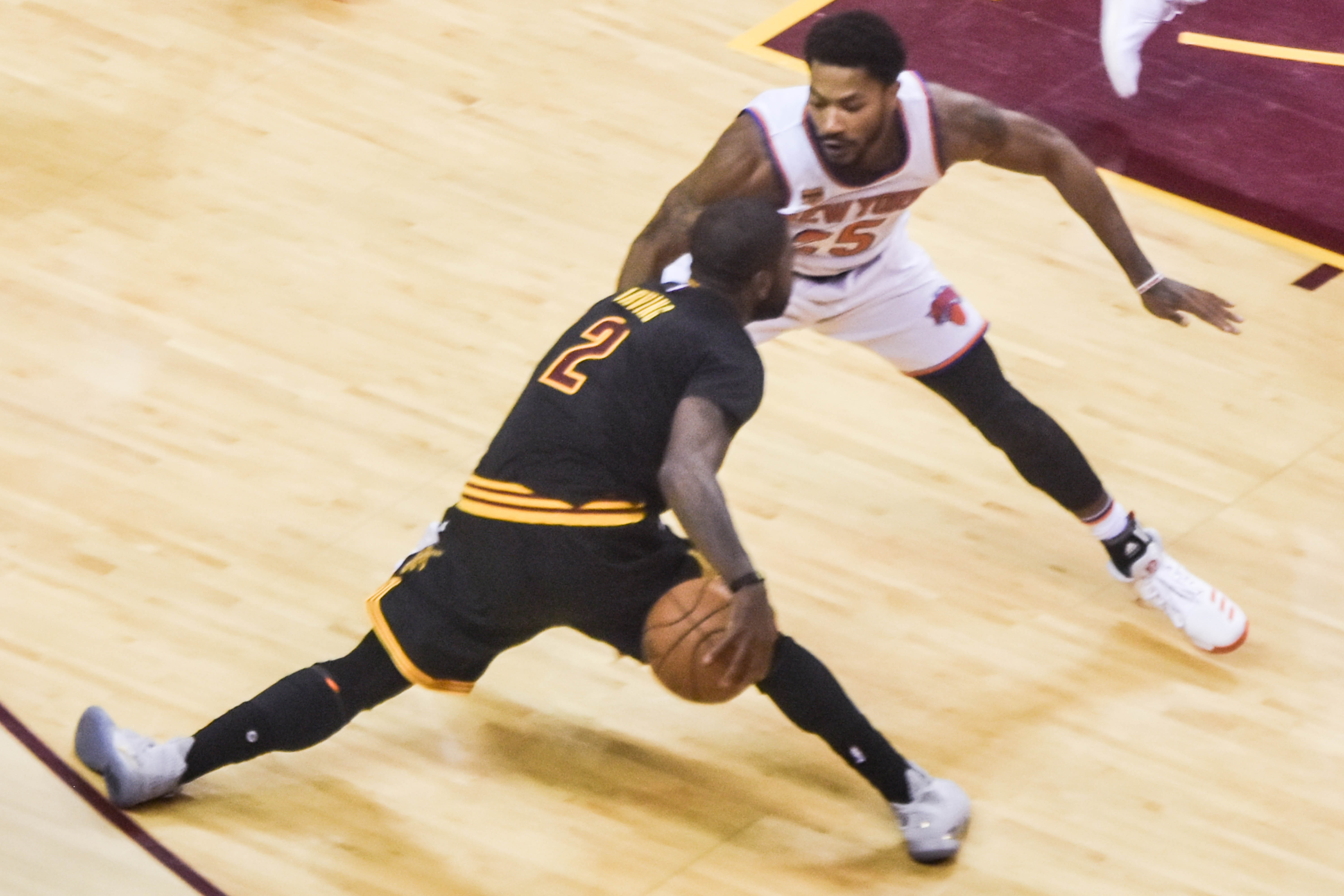
Rose defending Kyrie Irving in 2016

On June 22, 2016, Rose was traded, along with Justin Holiday and a 2017 second-round draft pick, to the New York Knicks in exchange for José Calderón, Jerian Grant and Robin Lopez. Rose opted for the number 25 shirt which he wore in his high school days, and stated that the Knicks are a "super team" with him, Carmelo Anthony and Kristaps Porziņģis among the ranks. It was later revealed that the point guard cried upon receiving the news from his agent that the Bulls decided to trade him.

Rose made his debut for the Knicks in the team's season opener on October 25 against the Cleveland Cavaliers. In 29 minutes of action, he scored 17 points on 7-of-17 shooting in a 117–88 loss. On November 4, Rose returned to Chicago for the first time as a member of the Knicks, recording 15 points and 11 assists in a 117–104 win over the Bulls. On November 17, he scored a season-high 27 points in a 119–112 loss to the Washington Wizards. He topped that mark on November 28, scoring 30 points in a 112–103 loss to the Oklahoma City Thunder. On December 3, Rose scored 24 points on 9-of-15 shooting against the Minnesota Timberwolves, hitting two key free throws with half a minute to go, to give the Knicks an insurmountable eight-point lead before ultimately winning 118–114. On December 12, he scored 25 points in a 118–112 win over the Los Angeles Lakers, hitting a clutch push shot with 19.4 seconds left to put the game beyond doubt.

On January 10, 2017, Rose was fined an undisclosed amount after he reportedly flew to Chicago to be with his mother but did not notify team officials ahead of their game against the New Orleans Pelicans on January 9. Eight days later, he matched his season high with 30 points in a 117–106 win over the Boston Celtics. As the season progressed, Rose increasingly expressed frustration with coach Jeff Hornacek's implementation of the triangle offense, describing it as "random" and "confusing". On April 2, 2017, he was ruled out for the rest of the season after tearing the meniscus in his left knee, necessitating a fourth round of knee surgery for Rose in his nine-year career. The Knicks vastly underperformed in the 2016–17 season, ending with a 31–51 record and missing the playoffs.

=== Cleveland Cavaliers (2017–2018) ===
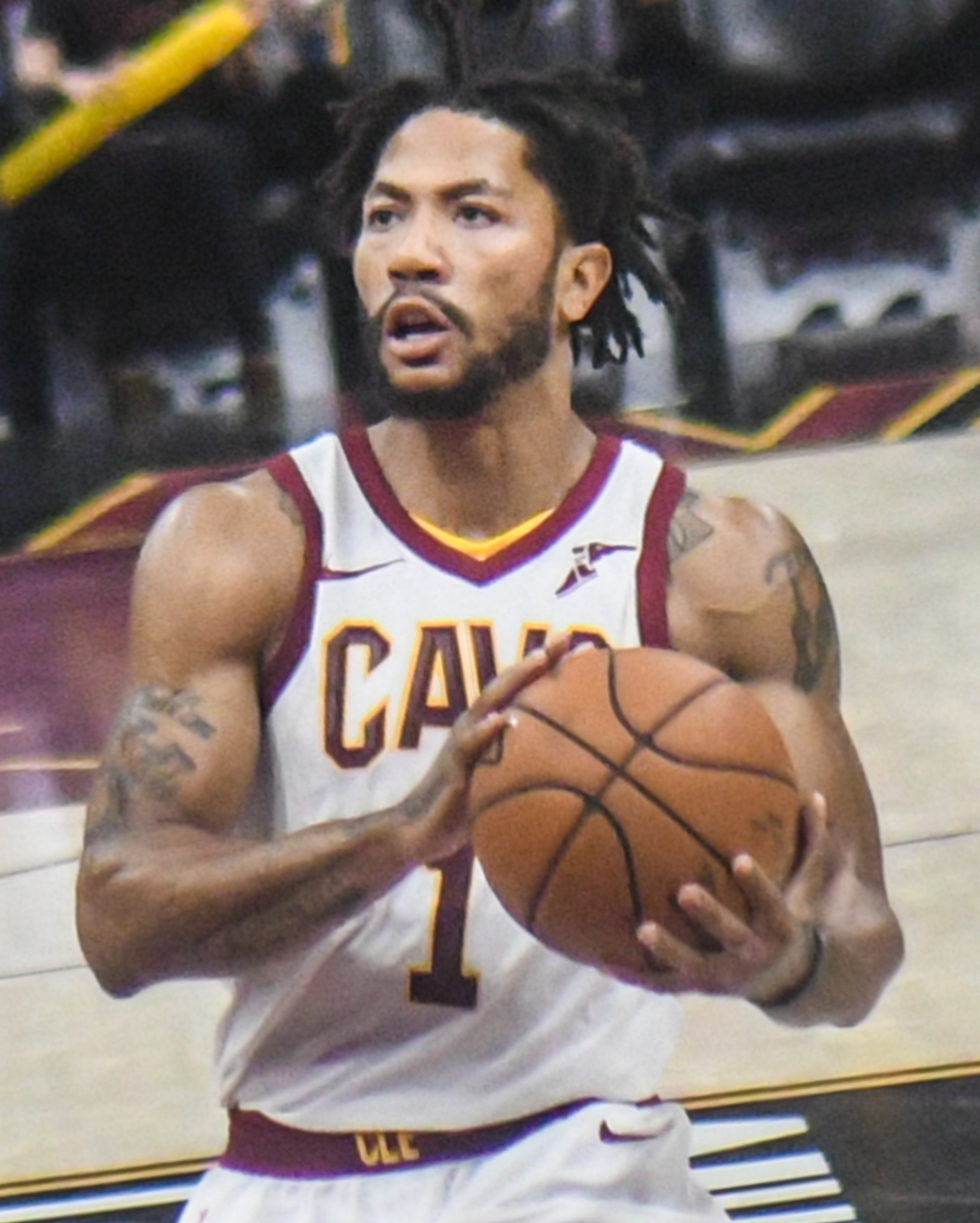
Rose with the Cleveland Cavaliers in 2017

On July 25, 2017, Rose signed with the Cleveland Cavaliers, joining forces with LeBron James. In his debut for the Cavaliers in their season opener against the Boston Celtics on October 17, 2017, Rose scored 14 points in a 102–99 win. In his highest-scoring game for the Cavaliers, on November 4, Rose recorded 20 points in a 130–122 win over the Washington Wizards. Four days later, against the Milwaukee Bucks, he suffered an ankle injury, after being fouled by Greg Monroe on a drive to the basket. On November 24, 2017, Rose left the team to re-evaluate his future in the NBA. His persistent injury issues caused him to question his desire to continue playing. He returned to working with the Cavaliers' medical staff in early December in hopes of recovering from a sprained left ankle and bone spurs. On January 18, 2018, Rose returned to the line-up after missing more than two months with ankle injuries and scored nine points in 13 minutes in a 104–103 win over the Orlando Magic.

=== Minnesota Timberwolves (2018–2019) ===
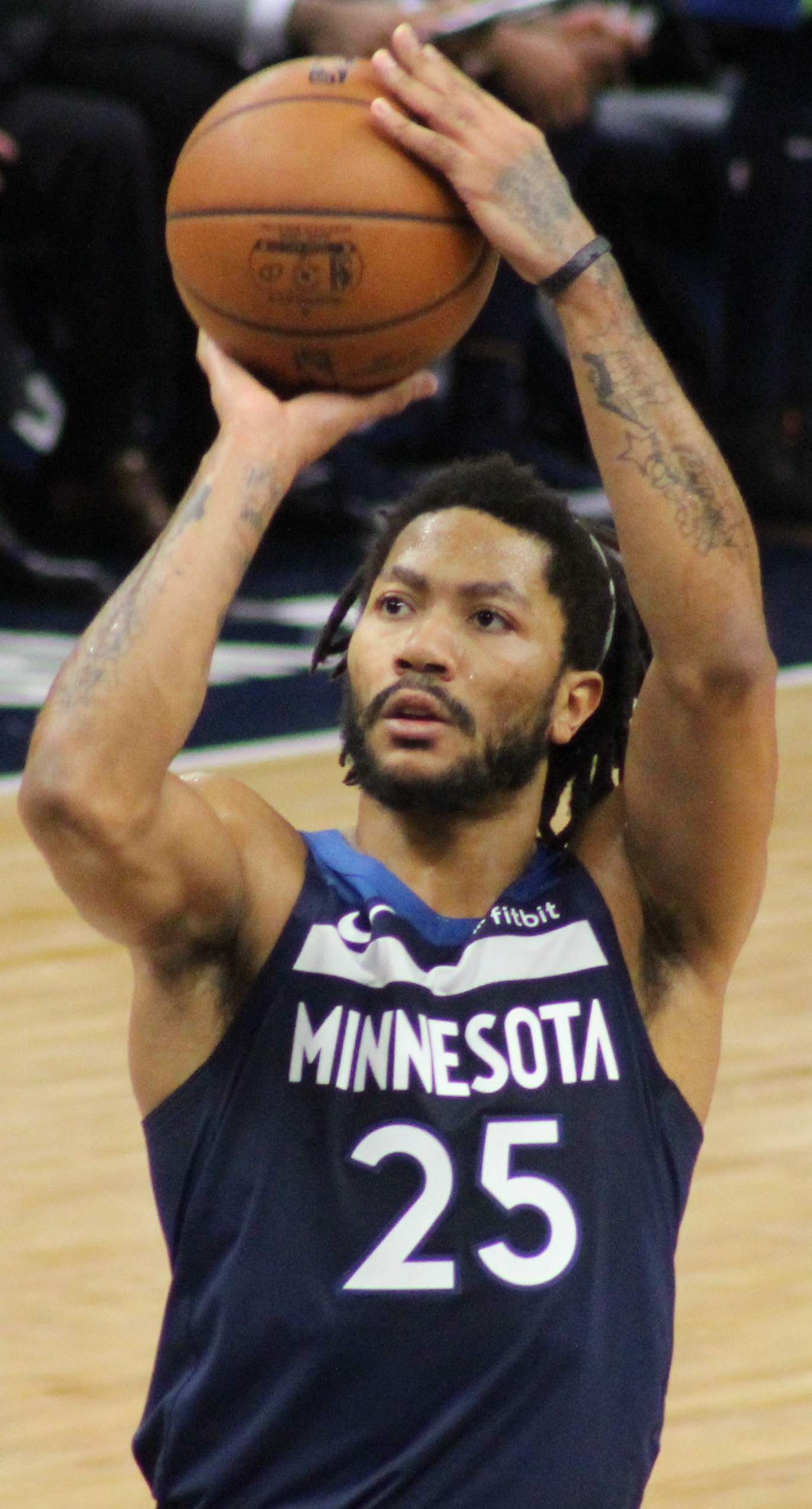
Rose with the Minnesota Timberwolves in 2018

On February 8, 2018, Rose was acquired by the Utah Jazz in a three-team trade that also involved the Cavaliers and the Sacramento Kings. Two days later, he was waived by the Jazz.

On March 8, 2018, Rose signed with the Minnesota Timberwolves, reuniting him with Tom Thibodeau, Jimmy Butler and Taj Gibson. After slowly getting back to his rhythm towards the end of the regular season, Rose averaged 14.2 points in 23.8 minutes per game in the playoffs, as the Timberwolves lost 4–1 to the Houston Rockets in the first round. His best performance of the series came on April 24, 2018, in Game 5, as he scored 17 points on 7-of-11 shooting in 32 minutes on the floor, including 2-of-2 from distance; however the Rockets won 119–100 after outscoring the Timberwolves 50–20 in the third quarter which Rose started on the bench.

On July 4, 2018, Rose re-signed with the Timberwolves for the 2018–19 season. On October 31, in his first start of the season, Rose scored a career-high 50 points in a 128–125 win over the Utah Jazz, securing the victory with a block on Utah's final shot as time expired. Rose shot 19-of-31 in 41 minutes on the court, hit four three pointers, and had 15 points in the last quarter, of which six came in the last minute. After the buzzer sounded, an emotional Rose burst into tears as his teammates swarmed him while MVP chants came from the crowd. In the post-game interview, when asked what the feat meant to him, Rose said: "Everything, I worked my [expletive] off". He received praise from players all over the league; LeBron James called Rose "a superhero" and a true definition of perseverance, while Dwyane Wade said that Rose was an example of never giving up on yourself. Timberwolves coach Tom Thibodeau after the game said that Rose "has the character, the humility and the courage", adding that he is among the most mentally tough people he had come across.

On November 8, Rose recorded 31 points in a 114–110 loss to the Los Angeles Lakers, hitting a career-best 7 three pointers from 9 attempts. On December 26, he had 24 points and eight assists and again received MVP chants in a 119–94 win over the Bulls in Chicago. It was only his second career game in the United Center against his former team. On January 15, 2019, against the Philadelphia 76ers, Rose reached 10,000 career points. On January 20, he scored 29 of his 31 points in the second half and hit an 18-footer with 0.6 seconds left to give the Timberwolves a 116–114 victory over the Phoenix Suns. Right ankle trouble saw Rose miss 11 of 19 games spanning late December to late January. He missed an additional three games in early February. On March 21, he was ruled out for the rest of the season with a right elbow injury. Rose ended the season with 18.0 points and 4.3 assists per game, with a career-high 37% field goal percentage for three pointers. However, the Timberwolves missed the playoffs, as they ended the season with a 36–46 record, enough only for the 11th spot in the Western Conference.

=== Detroit Pistons (2019–2021) ===
On July 7, 2019, Rose signed with the Detroit Pistons. On October 23, he made his debut for the Pistons, logging 18 points, three rebounds, and nine assists in a 119–110 win over the Indiana Pacers. On December 9, Rose scored the game winner in a 105–103 win over the New Orleans Pelicans, hitting a buzzer beater with a close range fadeaway jumper against Jrue Holiday. Rose scored 17 out of his 21 points in the fourth quarter, where he shot 7-of-8 from the field, including two three pointers from two attempts. On December 15, in the 115–107 win against the Houston Rockets, he had a double-double with 20 points and 12 assists, scoring ten points in the final quarter.

Rose became the first player in Pistons history to record seven consecutive 20+ point games as a reserve, which also coincided with his career-high 14-game streak of scoring 20 points or more. The most notable games of the streak included a 116–103 win over the Boston Celtics on January 15, 2020, in which Rose scored 22 points on 11-of-13 shooting, followed by a 136–103 win against the Atlanta Hawks three days later, where he had 27 points and 9 assists. The streak ended after he suffered a groin injury during a game against the Denver Nuggets. During the month of January when he accomplished the feat, Rose averaged 22 points, six assists and three rebounds, while shooting 51% from the floor. In his third game after returning from injury, Rose scored a season-high 31 points en route to a win against the Phoenix Suns. Despite a strong individual season by Rose as the team's sixth man, the Pistons ended the season at the 13th place in the Eastern Conference with a disappointing 20–46 record, having struggled without their best player Blake Griffin, who featured in only 15 games due to injuries.

=== Return to New York (2021–2023) ===
On February 8, 2021, Rose was traded back to the New York Knicks for Dennis Smith Jr. and a 2021 second-round draft pick, once again reuniting him with coach Tom Thibodeau and former teammate Taj Gibson. Rose made his return debut on February 20 in a 98–96 loss against the Miami Heat, in which he provided an immediate offensive spark for the Knicks, scoring 14 points and dishing three assists. He peaked in May, scoring 25 points on 11-of-15 shooting in the 118–104 win against the Memphis Grizzlies on May 4, and equalling that tally while adding eight assists six days later in a 106–100 win against the Los Angeles Clippers. On May 12, in an overtime loss against the Los Angeles Lakers, he recorded a season-high 27 points with 6 assists and 6 rebounds. Rose was a major contributor coming from the bench, helping the Knicks finish fourth in the East and placing third in the Sixth Man of the Year voting.

On May 24, 2021, in his first playoff game since 2018, Rose had 17 points, five assists and five rebounds off the bench as the Knicks lost to the Atlanta Hawks 107–105. In Game 2, coach Thibodeau put Rose in the starting unit for the second half after initially being on the bench, and he responded with a game-high 26 points for the Knicks, leading his team to a 101–92 win to even the series. On May 28, during Game 3 of the Knicks' first round series against the Atlanta Hawks, Rose made his first playoff start since the 2015 conference semifinals, recording a season-high 30 points, as well as six rebounds and five assists, in a 105–94 loss as Atlanta took a 2–1 series lead. The Hawks went on to win the series 4–1, as Rose suffered a knee injury in the closing of the series. He averaged 19.4 points over the five games, leading the Knicks in scoring for the series.

On August 18, 2021, the Knicks extended Rose's contract by three years with a $43 million deal. On November 3, Rose surpassed 12,000 career points in a 111–98 loss against the Indiana Pacers. On November 6, Rose helped the Knicks erase a 21-point deficit against the champion Milwaukee Bucks, scoring 23 points off the bench on 10-of-18 shooting in a 113–98 win. On December 17, 2021, in a 116–103 win over the Houston Rockets, Rose suffered a right ankle injury. Five days later, he had surgery on his ankle and was ruled out for at least two months. On February 25, 2022, Rose underwent another procedure to address a skin infection on his ankle and was ruled out indefinitely.

In the 2022–23 season, Rose averaged only 12 minutes per game from the bench and was removed from the Knicks rotation by Tom Thibodeau in December 2022. On June 24, 2023, the Knicks declined Rose's team option for the 2023–24 season, rendering him a free agent.

=== Memphis Grizzlies (2023–2024) ===
On July 3, 2023, Rose signed with the Memphis Grizzlies. He chose to wear the number 23, the same number he wore when playing for the University of Memphis. He received an ovation in his debut from Memphis fans on October 26, as he scored 8 points in 16 minutes off the bench in a 111–104 loss to the New Orleans Pelicans. In November 2023, Rose missed eight games due to left knee soreness. On November 24, Rose scored a then season-high 17 points on 8-of-9 shooting in a 110–89 loss to the Phoenix Suns. Rose was named a starter for the Grizzlies for the first time on November 30 against the Utah Jazz, helping his team to a 105–91 win with 14 points on 7-of-11 shooting from the field, and nine assists.

On December 14, Rose posted a season-high 19 points in a 117–104 loss against the Houston Rockets, playing a season-high 31 minutes. Two days later, in a rematch against the Rockets, Rose suffered a hamstring injury on his left leg, which kept recurring in January and February, reducing him to sporadic appearances and limited minutes for the Grizzlies. On March 30, 2024, he was ruled out for the rest of the season with a lower back injury suffered in the beginning of March. He finished the season with an average of 8 points, 3 assists and 2 rebounds in 16 minutes per game, having played in only 24 games due to injuries.

Rose indicated his intention to return to the Grizzlies for the 2024–25 season. However, on September 23, 2024, he was waived by the Grizzlies.

On September 26, 2024, Rose announced his retirement. On January 4, 2025, the Bulls honored Rose during a game against the New York Knicks, also his former team, where it would be announced that the franchise had plans to retire Rose’s number 1 jersey during the 2025–26 season, which they did on January 24, 2026, in a win against the Boston Celtics, 114-111.

== National team career ==
Rose was a member of the United States men's national basketball teams that won gold medals at the 2010 and 2014 FIBA World Cup.

== Player profile ==
Standing at 6 feet 3 inches (1.91 m) and weighing 200 pounds (91 kg), Rose played mostly at the point guard position. He averaged 17.4 points per game for his career. Rose has one All-NBA selection to his name in 2011, the year he was also voted NBA MVP of the regular season. He also won the NBA Rookie of the Year award in 2009.

In his prime in Chicago, Rose was widely considered to be one of the most athletic point guards in NBA history before a string of knee injuries slowed him down. A combination of explosiveness, leaping ability and speed allowed him to attack the basket frequently, using a repertoire of acrobatic finishes to score over taller players. Rose clocked in a maximum vertical jump of 40 inches during the 2008 NBA Combine. After the injuries, Rose compensated for his loss of athleticism by becoming more patient, methodical and creative with his shot selection, which increased his efficiency compared to his early years when he considered himself to be more "reckless". His control, composure and finesse helped him keep his place among the best rim finishers in the NBA in the 2019–20 season, with his 4.7 field goals made on drives coming second behind only Luka Dončić and Russell Westbrook with 4.8, while he ranked first in the league in field goal percentage on attempts from drives among players with at least 6.0 attempts with 56.4%. In the process of reinventing his game, Rose also increased his reliance on floaters, runners and push shots, leading the league in the 2020–21 season in accuracy with 53% from the field on these attempts. Due to Rose's injury history, in his later years his minutes on the court were reduced and he became more of a role player.

Rose was never a knock-down shooter from the arc, shooting 30 percent during his career. However, in the later stages of his career, he improved his shooting mechanics and managed to develop a reliable three point shot. In his second stint with the New York Knicks, Rose shot above 40 percent from three. Rose started using the bank shot more frequently and with greater success during the 2015–16 season, after struggling with his shooting due to what he attributed to depth perception issues following eye surgery in 2015.

Rose received criticism about his defense early in his career, but he was praised for his defensive contributions as a veteran in his second Knicks stint. Rose has also been widely recognized for his leadership skills and mentoring of younger players.

== Career statistics ==
Legend
GP	Games played	GS	Games started	MPG	Minutes per game
FG%	Field goal percentage	3P%	3-point field goal percentage	FT%	Free throw percentage
RPG	Rebounds per game	APG	Assists per game	SPG	Steals per game
BPG	Blocks per game	PPG	Points per game	**Bold**	Career high

=== NBA ===
==== Regular season ====
Year	Team	GP	GS	MPG	FG%	3P%	FT%	RPG	APG	SPG	BPG	PPG
2008–09	Chicago	**81**	80	37.0	.475	.222	.788	3.9	6.3	.8	.2	16.8
2009–10	Chicago	78	78	36.8	.489	.267	.766	3.8	6.0	.7	.3	20.8
2010–11	Chicago	**81**	**81**	**37.4**	.445	.332	.858	**4.1**	7.7	1.0	.6	**25.0**
2011–12	Chicago	39	39	35.2	.435	.312	.812	3.4	**7.9**	.9	**.7**	21.8
2013–14	Chicago	10	10	31.1	.354	.340	.844	3.2	4.3	.5	.1	15.9
2014–15	Chicago	51	51	30.0	.405	.280	.813	3.2	4.9	.7	.3	17.7
2015–16	Chicago	66	66	31.8	.427	.293	.793	3.4	4.7	.7	.2	16.4
2016–17	New York	64	64	32.5	.471	.217	.874	3.8	4.4	.7	.3	18.0
2017–18	Cleveland	16	7	19.2	.439	.250	.854	1.8	1.6	.2	.3	9.8
2017–18	Minnesota	9	0	12.4	.426	.167	**1.000**	.7	1.2	.4	.0	5.8
2018–19	Minnesota	51	13	27.3	.482	.370	.856	2.7	4.3	.6	.2	18.0
2019–20	Detroit	50	15	26.0	**.490**	.306	.871	2.4	5.6	.8	.3	18.1
2020–21	Detroit	15	0	22.8	.429	.333	.840	1.9	4.2	**1.2**	.3	14.2
2020–21	New York	35	3	26.8	.487	**.411**	.883	2.5	4.2	.9	.4	14.9
2021–22	New York	26	4	24.5	.445	.402	.968	3.0	4.0	.8	.5	12.0
2022–23	New York	27	0	12.5	.384	.302	.917	1.5	1.7	.3	.2	5.6
2023–24	Memphis	24	7	16.6	.461	.366	.889	1.9	3.3	.3	.1	8.0
Career		723	518	30.5	.456	.316	.831	3.2	5.2	.7	.3	17.4
All-Star		3	2	21.2	.517	.667	.500	1.3	4.0	1.3	.0	11.0

==== Playoffs ====
Year	Team	GP	GS	MPG	FG%	3P%	FT%	RPG	APG	SPG	BPG	PPG
2009	Chicago	7	7	**44.7**	.492	.000	.800	6.3	6.4	.6	.7	19.7
2010	Chicago	5	5	42.4	.456	.333	.818	3.4	7.2	.8	.0	26.8
2011	Chicago	**16**	**16**	40.6	.396	.248	.828	4.3	7.7	**1.4**	.7	**27.1**
2012	Chicago	1	1	37.0	.391	.500	**1.000**	**9.0**	**9.0**	1.0	**1.0**	23.0
2015	Chicago	12	12	37.8	.396	.348	.897	4.8	6.5	1.2	.5	20.3
2018	Minnesota	5	0	23.8	**.509**	**.700**	.857	1.8	2.6	.4	.0	14.2
2021	New York	5	3	35.0	.476	.471	**1.000**	4.0	5.0	.4	.2	19.4
2023	New York	1	0	3.0	.000	.000	—	.0	1.0	.0	.0	.0
Career		52	44	37.7	.426	.322	.845	4.3	6.3	.9	.5	21.9

=== College ===
Year	Team	GP	GS	MPG	FG%	3P%	FT%	RPG	APG	SPG	BPG	PPG
2007–08	Memphis	40	40	29.2	.477	.337	.712	4.5	4.7	1.2	.4	14.9

== Awards and accomplishments ==
=== NBA ===
- NBA Most Valuable Player: 2011
- NBA All-Star Selection: 2010, 2011, 2012
- All-NBA First Team: 2011
- NBA Rookie of the Year: 2009
- NBA All-Rookie First Team: 2009
- Skills Challenge Champion: 2009
- Conference Rookie of the Month: November, December, March
- Conference Player of the Month: April 2010, March 2011

=== College ===
- Freshman year (2007–08)
  - NCAA Tournament All-Final Four Team
  - NCAA Tournament South Region MVP
  - NABC 3rd Team All-American
  - NABC All-District 7 First Team
  - All-Conference USA First Team
  - Conference USA Freshman of the Year
  - Conference USA All Freshman Team 1st Team
  - Sporting News All-Freshman Team
  - Conference USA Player of the Week for games between December 17 through the 23rd
  - 2K Sports College Hoops Classic MVP
  - 2K Sports College Hoops Classic All-Tournament Team

=== High school ===
- Senior year (2006–07)
  - Class AA State Championship
  - Class AA Tournament MVP
  - Illinois Mr. Basketball 2007
  - 2007 McDonald's All-American
  - USA Today 2007 All-USA First Team
  - 2007 First-team Parade All-American
  - EA Sports 2007 All-American First Team
  - All State Illinois 2007
  - MaxPreps.com All-America First Team
  - Slam Magazine 2007 First Team
  - MidStateHoops.com 2007 Class AA Player of the Year
- Junior year (2005–06)
  - Class AA State Championship
  - Class AA Tournament MVP
  - 2006 Parade All-American Fourth Team
  - All State Illinois 2006
  - EA Sports 2006 All-American Second Team
- Sophomore year (2004–05)
  - 2005 Parade All-American Third Team
  - Chicago Sun-Times All-Area

== Personal life ==
Rose is a Christian and has spoken about his faith, saying "God does everything for a reason". He wears a wristband that says "In Jesus' Name I Play" and has several tattoos about his faith. On October 9, 2012, Rose's ex-girlfriend, Mieka Reese, gave birth to their son Derrick Jr. In 2016, Rose started dating model and fitness influencer Alaina Anderson. The two married on September 7, 2023, in Los Angeles, after getting engaged in 2021. Their daughter Layla was born in 2018 and their son London in 2019.

Rose's agent is former Bulls guard B. J. Armstrong. In 2018, Rose introduced The Rose Scholars, a scholarship program to help students achieve a higher education. Rose is an avid chess player, with The Sporting News saying, "There is no bigger (chess) fanatic in the NBA than Rose."

=== Sexual assault case ===
In 2016, Rose was involved in a federal civil lawsuit to assess whether he and two friends raped an unnamed former girlfriend in August 2013. In the months before the alleged gang-rape, Rose's accuser, referred to as "Jane Doe" in court transcripts, testified that Rose made her uncomfortable by asking her to perform sexual acts for him or to involve other people in their sex life; he would sometimes get angry when she refused. Doe also mentioned that on the day of the incident, she was drugged against her consent, and alternated in and out of consciousness. During the trial, Rose expressed difficulty and uncertainty with the definition of the word "consent". In October 2016, he was found not liable by an eight-member jury. An appeal in 2018 was denied.

== Endorsements ==
Rose was the cover athlete of NBA 2K13 alongside fellow NBA players Kevin Durant and Blake Griffin.

Rose was the lone cover athlete for the 2K Sports Downloadable Content game, NBA 2K10 Draft Combine, which was released on Xbox Live Arcade for the Xbox 360 and PlayStation Network for the PlayStation 3.

Rose is a part-owner and spokesman for the Chicago-based Giordano's Pizzeria.

In 2008, Rose signed a shoe deal with Adidas for $1 million per year. He has also signed with Wilson Sporting Goods. Other endorsement deals include Skullcandy headphones, Powerade, Force Factor sports drinks and a suburban Chicago Nissan dealership. In May 2018, it was announced that the Adidas D Rose 9's would be released in July 2018.

In 2011, Rose was estimated by Crain's Chicago Business to earn $1.5–$2.5 million annually in endorsements, ranking just outside the top 10 NBA players in that category. In 2012, it was reported that Rose signed a contract extension with Adidas, worth $185 million over 14 years.

Rose was the cover athlete of NBA 2K27 alongside Victor Wembanyama and Caitlin Clark.

== See also ==
- 2006 high school boys basketball All-Americans

Preceded by Jon Scheyer	Illinois Mr. Basketball; 2007	Succeeded by Kevin Dillard
