= Jerome Jordan =

Jamaican basketball player (born 1986)

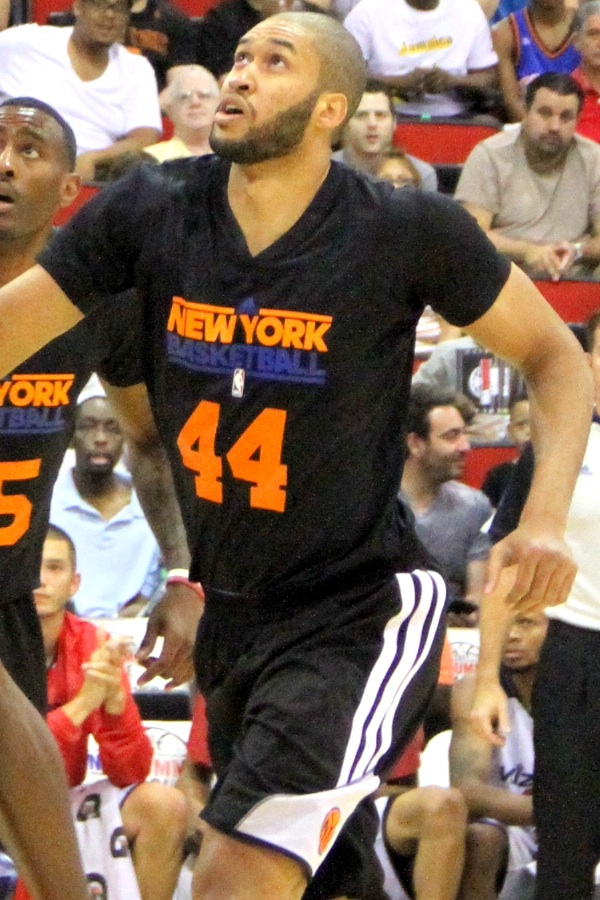
- Jordan in 2013

Personal information
- Born: September 29, 1986 (age 40) Kingston, Jamaica
- Listed height: 7 ft 0 in (2.13 m)
- Listed weight: 253 lb (115 kg)

Career information
- High school: Jamaica College (Kingston, Jamaica); Florida Air Academy (Melbourne, Florida)
- College: Tulsa (2006–2010)
- NBA draft: 2010: 2nd round, 44th overall pick
- Drafted by: Milwaukee Bucks
- Playing career: 2010–2024
- Position: Center

Career history
- 2010–2011: Hemofarm
- 2011: Krka
- 2011–2012: New York Knicks
- 2012: →Erie BayHawks
- 2012–2013: Reno Bighorns
- 2013: Los Angeles D-Fenders
- 2013: Talk 'N Text Tropang Texters
- 2013–2014: Virtus Bologna
- 2014–2015: Brooklyn Nets
- 2015–2016: Jiangsu Monkey King
- 2016: Sevilla
- 2016–2018: Joventut Badalona
- 2018: Breogán
- 2018–2019: Andorra
- 2019–2020: Merkezefendi Bld. Denizli Basket
- 2020: Real Betis
- 2020: Al-Muharraq
- 2021: Real Betis
- 2021–2022: Rizing Zephyr Fukuoka
- 2023: Peñarol Mar del Plata
- 2023–2024: RANS Simba Bogor

Career highlights
- All-NBA D-League Third Team (2013); NBA D-League All-Star (2013); First-team All-C-USA (2009); Second-team All-C-USA (2010); 3× C-USA All-Defensive Team (2008–2010)
- Stats at NBA.com
- Stats at Basketball Reference
Medals
Men's basketball
Representing Jamaica
FIBA CBC Championship
Gold medal – first place	2006 Kingston

Jerome Adolphus Jordan (born September 29, 1986) is a Jamaican former professional basketball player. He played college basketball for the University of Tulsa and represents the Jamaica national team in international competition.

== Early life ==
Jordan was born to parents Bryan and Faith Jordan in Kingston, Jamaica, a city with just two hardwood courts, and it was not until age 16 that Jordan began playing basketball. Stephen Johnston, a former Jamaica national team captain, found a spot for Jordan at Redemption Christian Academy in Troy, New York, which he attended with his sister, Jheanelle, while his parents stayed in Jamaica. However, after one semester, Bryan withdrew Jerome and Jheanelle from the school and they returned to Kingston.

After graduating from Jamaica College, Jordan enrolled at Florida Air Academy in Melbourne, Florida. However, he was ineligible to play in 2005–06 due to an academic transfer rule.

== College career ==
On April 26, 2006, Jordan signed a National Letter of Intent to play college basketball for the University of Tulsa.

In his freshman season at Tulsa in 2006–07, Jordan played 23 games (10 starts) while averaging 2.7 points and 2.1 rebounds in 7.8 minutes per game.

In his sophomore season, Jordan was named to the Conference USA All-Defensive team and All-Tournament team after a season where he finished second in the conference in rebounds and first in field goal percentage and blocked shots. He also led Golden Hurricane to the 2008 CBI championship and was named the tournament MVP. In 39 games (all starts), he averaged 10.5 points, 7.9 rebounds and 3.7 blocks per game.

In his junior season, Jordan was named to the All-Conference USA first team after he earned Player of the Week honors four times. He was also named to the All-Defensive team for the second straight year after his 91 blocked shots gave him the number 1 and 2 positions on the school's single-season blocked shots list. In 36 games (35 starts), he averaged 13.8 points, 8.6 rebounds and 2.5 blocks per game.

In his senior season, Jordan was named to the All-Conference USA second team and NABC Division I All-District 11 first team. In 35 games (all starts), he averaged 15.4 points, 9.1 rebounds and 2.4 blocks in 29.8 minutes per game. He finished his career as the only player in Conference USA history to record at least 800 rebounds and 300 blocks, while setting the school and conference record for blocked shots with 333 blocks.

== Professional career ==
=== 2010–11 season ===
Jordan was selected with the 44th overall pick in the 2010 NBA draft by the Milwaukee Bucks. On July 8, 2010, his rights were traded to the New York Knicks in exchange for cash considerations. He joined the Knicks for the 2010 NBA Summer League. Later that year, he signed with KK Hemofarm of Serbia for the 2010–11 season.

=== 2011–12 season ===
On July 29, 2011, Jordan signed with BC Krka of the Premier A Slovenian Basketball League. Following the conclusion of the NBA lockout, he returned to the United States.

On December 15, 2011, Jordan signed with the New York Knicks. During the 2011–12 season, he was assigned multiple times to the Erie BayHawks of the NBA Development League.

=== 2012–13 season ===
On July 11, 2012, Jordan was traded, along with Toney Douglas, Josh Harrellson and two future second-round draft picks, to the Houston Rockets in exchange for Marcus Camby. On July 18, 2012, he was waived by the Rockets. The next day, he joined the New York Knicks for the final two games of the 2012 NBA Summer League.

On September 29, 2012, Jordan signed with the Memphis Grizzlies. However, he was later waived by the Grizzlies on October 27, 2012.

On December 18, 2012, Jordan was acquired by the Reno Bighorns of the NBA Development League. On February 4, 2013, he was named to the Futures All-Star roster for the 2013 NBA D-League All-Star Game.

On February 25, 2013, Jordan was traded to the Los Angeles D-Fenders. In April 2013, he joined the Talk 'N Text Tropang Texters as an import for the 2013 Commissioner's Cup.

=== 2013–14 season ===
In July 2013, Jordan joined the Indiana Pacers for the Orlando Summer League and the New York Knicks for the Las Vegas Summer League. On September 16, 2013, he signed with Virtus Bologna of Italy for the 2013–14 season.

=== 2014–15 season ===
In July 2014, Jordan joined the Los Angeles Lakers for the 2014 NBA Summer League. On September 11, 2014, he signed with the Brooklyn Nets.

=== 2015–16 season ===
On October 11, 2015, Jordan signed with the New Orleans Pelicans. However, he was waived by the Pelicans on October 16 before appearing in a game with them. On December 15, he signed with Jiangsu Monkey King of China for the 2015–16 CBA season. After the end of the Chinese regular season, on February 20, he signed with Baloncesto Sevilla of Spain for the rest of the 2015–16 ACB season.

=== 2016–17 season ===
On October 31, 2016, Jordan signed with Joventut Badalona for the rest of the 2016–17 season.

=== 2018–19 season ===
On August 17, 2018, Shaanxi Wolves of the National Basketball League was reported to have signed Jordan. On September 30, he signed with Cafés Candelas Breogán of the Liga ACB. On December 31, he signed with Andorra of the Liga ACB.

=== 2019–20 season ===
On January 3, 2020, he has signed with Coosur Real Betis of the Liga ACB. Jordan averaged 7.5 points and 5.2 rebounds per game. Jordan parted ways with the team on June 2.

=== 2020–21 season ===
On August 1, 2020, Jordan signed with Al-Muharraq in Bahrain. On December 17, 2020, he has signed with Real Betis of the Liga ACB.

== NBA career statistics ==
Legend
GP	Games played	GS	Games started	MPG	Minutes per game
FG%	Field goal percentage	3P%	3-point field goal percentage	FT%	Free throw percentage
RPG	Rebounds per game	APG	Assists per game	SPG	Steals per game
BPG	Blocks per game	PPG	Points per game	**Bold**	Career high

=== Regular season ===
Year	Team	GP	GS	MPG	FG%	3P%	FT%	RPG	APG	SPG	BPG	PPG
2011–12	New York	21	0	5.1	.515	.000	.800	1.3	.2	.0	**.3**	2.0
2014–15	Brooklyn	**44**	0	**8.7**	**.532**	.000	**.864**	**2.4**	**.3**	**.2**	**.3**	**3.1**
Career		65	0	7.6	.528	.000	.852	2.0	.3	.1	.3	2.8

=== Playoffs ===
Year	Team	GP	GS	MPG	FG%	3P%	FT%	RPG	APG	SPG	BPG	PPG
2012	New York	**1**	0	4.0	**.500**	.000	.000	**2.0**	.0	.0	.0	**2.0**
2015	Brooklyn	**1**	0	**5.0**	.000	.000	.000	**2.0**	.0	.0	.0	.0
Career		2	0	4.5	.250	.000	.000	2.0	.0	.0	.0	1.0
