= Hawaii Rainbow Warriors basketball statistical leaders =

The Hawaii Rainbow Warriors basketball statistical leaders are individual statistical leaders of the Hawaii Rainbow Warriors basketball program in various categories, including points, rebounds, assists, steals, and blocks. Within those areas, the lists identify single-game, single-season, and career leaders. The Rainbow Warriors represent the University of Hawaii at Manoa in the NCAA's Mountain West Conference.

Hawaii began competing in intercollegiate basketball in 1918. However, the school's record book does not generally list records from before the 1950s, as records from before this period are often incomplete and inconsistent. Since scoring was much lower in this era, and teams played much fewer games during a typical season, it is likely that few or no players from this era would appear on these lists anyway.

The NCAA did not officially record assists as a stat until the 1983–84 season, and blocks and steals until the 1985–86 season, but Hawaii's record books includes players in these stats before these seasons. These lists are updated through the end of the 2020–21 season.

== Scoring ==
Career
Rank	Player	Points	Seasons
1	Chris Gaines	1,734	1986–87 1987–88 1988–89 1989–90
2	John Penebacker	1,519	1969–70 1970–71 1971–72 1972–73
3	Alika Smith	1,415	1994–95 1995–96 1996–97 1997–98
4	Predrag Savovic	1,414	1999–00 2000–01 2001–02
5	Melton Werts	1,314	1972–73 1973–74 1974–75 1975–76
6	Phil Lott	1,290	1988–89 1989–90 1990–91 1991–92
7	Noel Coleman	1,271	2020–21 2021–22 2022–23 2023–24
8	Carl English	1,259	1999–00 2000–01 2001–02 2002–03
9	Phil Martin	1,231	2000–01 2001–02 2002–03 2003–04
10	Julian Sensley	1,230	2003–04 2004–05 2005–06

Season
Rank	Player	Points	Season
1	Anthony Harris	626	1995–96
2	Trevor Ruffin	625	1993–94
3	Chris Gaines	616	1989–90
4	Gavin Smith	608	1976–77
5	Carl English	607	2002–03
6	Michael Kuebler	598	2003–04
7	Tom Henderson	567	1973–74
8	Christian Standhardinger	560	2013–14
9	Reggie Cross	559	1988–89
10	Predrag Savovic	545	2000–01

Single game
Rank	Player	Points	Season	Opponent
1	Tony Davis	45	1958–59	Cal State LA
2	Trevor Ruffin	42	1993–94	Louisville
3	Gavin Smith	40	1976–77	Houston Baptist
4	Roderick Flemings	39	2009–10	Cal Poly
5	Trevor Ruffin	38	1993–94	UTEP
6	Roderick Flemings	37	2008–09	Eastern Washington
	Tes Whitlock	37	1994–95	Seton Hall
	Gavin Smith	37	1976–77	Oregon State
	Gavin Smith	37	1976–77	Southwestern Louisiana
	Paul Hoffman	37	1968–69	Baylor

== Rebounds ==
Career
Rank	Player	Rebounds	Seasons
1	Melton Werts	1,098	1972–73 1973–74 1974–75 1975–76
2	John Penebacker	870	1969–70 1970–71 1971–72 1972–73
3	Vander Joaquim	828	2010–11 2011–12 2012–13
4	Bob Nash	721	1970–71 1971–72
5	Bernardo da Silva	679	2019–20 2020–21 2021–22 2022–23 2023–24
6	Haim Shimonovich	631	2000–01 2001–02 2002–03 2003–04
7	Phil Martin	618	2000–01 2001–02 2002–03 2003–04
8	Tony Maroney	602	1993–94 1994–95
9	Julian Sensley	598	2003–04 2004–05 2005–06
10	Tim Shepherd	577	1989–90 1990–91 1991–92 1992–93

Season
Rank	Player	Rebounds	Season
1	Bob Nash	361	1971–72
2	Bob Nash	360	1970–71
3	Melton Werts	343	1973–74
4	Tony Maroney	323	1993–94
5	Al Davis	310	1970–71
6	Vander Joaquim	304	2011–12
7	Melton Werts	300	1972–73
8	Tony Maroney	279	1994–95
9	Tommy Barker	268	1975–76
10	Vander Joaquim	263	2010–11

Single game
Rank	Player	Rebounds	Season	Opponent
1	Bob Nash	30	1971–72	Arizona State
2	Bob Nash	26	1971–72	Loyola
3	Bob Nash	25	1970–71	Rhode Island
4	Bob Nash	23	1971–72	Pepperdine
	Bob Nash	23	1971–72	Redlands
6	Melton Werts	22	1973–74	Westmont College
	Melton Werts	22	1972–73	UNLV
	Bob Nash	22	1971–72	Linfield
9	Melton Werts	21	1973–74	South Alabama
	Melton Werts	21	1972–73	New Mexico

== Assists ==
Career
Rank	Player	Assists	Seasons
1	Drew Buggs	437	2017–18 2018–19 2019–20
2	Troy Bowe	412	1988–89 1989–90 1990–91
3	Anthony Carter	403	1996–97 1997–98
4	Kalia McGee	392	1991–92 1992–93 1993–94 1994–95
5	Roderick Bobbitt	367	2014–15 2015–16
6	JoVon McClanahan	366	2020–21 2021–22 2022–23 2023–24
7	William Colston	352	1981–82 1982–83 1983–84 1984–85
8	Tom Henderson	567	1972–73 1973–74
9	Alika Smith	344	1994–95 1995–96 1996–97 1997–98
10	Mark Campbell	343	2001–02 2002–03

Season
Rank	Player	Assists	Season
1	Anthony Carter	212	1997–98
2	Reggie Carter	199	1975–76
3	Mark Campbell	192	2002–03
4	Tom Henderson	191	1973–74
	Anthony Carter	191	1996–97
6	Roderick Bobbitt	187	2014–15
7	Jace Tavita	181	2012–13
8	Roderick Bobbitt	180	2015–16
9	Troy Bowe	177	1990–91
10	Jeremiah Ostrowski	175	2011–12

Single game
Rank	Player	Assists	Season	Opponent
1	Reggie Carter	19	1975–76	San Francisco
2	Victor Kelly	18	1974–75	Centenary
3	Roderick Bobbitt	14	2015–16	Montana State
4	Jeremiah Ostrowski	13	2011–12	New Mexico State
	Anthony Carter	13	1996–97	Ball State
	Troy Bowe	13	1990–91	Wyoming

== Steals ==
Career
Rank	Player	Steals	Seasons
1	Roderick Bobbitt	168	2014–15 2015–16
2	Tom Henderson	160	1972–73 1973–74
3	Alika Smith	152	1994–95 1995–96 1996–97 1997–98
4	Troy Bowe	146	1988–89 1989–90 1990–91
5	Tony Webster	143	1980–81 1982–83
6	Matt Gibson	142	2004–05 2005–06 2006–07 2007–08
	Anthony Carter	142	1996–97 1997–98
8	Chris Gaines	127	1986–87 1987–88 1988–89 1989–90
9	Quincy Smith	126	2013–14 2014–15 2015–16
10	Phil Martin	113	2000–01 2001–02 2002–03 2003–04

Season
Rank	Player	Steals	Season
1	Roderick Bobbitt	100	2014–15
2	Tom Henderson	84	1972–73
3	Anthony Carter	78	1996–97
4	Tom Henderson	76	1973–74
5	Tony Webster	72	1982–83
6	Tony Webster	71	1980–81
7	Roderick Bobbitt	68	2015–16
8	Racky Sesler	64	1981–82
	Anthony Carter	64	1997–98
10	Troy Bowe	59	1989–90

Single game
Rank	Player	Steals	Season	Opponent
1	Roderick Bobbitt	10	2014–15	UH-Hilo
2	Tony Webster	9	1982–83	Air Force
3	Tony Webster	8	1980–81	McNeese State
4	Tony Webster	7	1982–83	Northern Iowa
5	Dre Bullock	6	2025–26	Cal Poly
	Justin Webster	6	2020–21	CSU Bakersfield
	Quincy Smith	6	2015–16	UC Santa Barbara
	Isaac Fleming	6	2015–16	Northern Iowa
	Riley Luettgerodt	6	2007–08	Utah State
	Anthony Carter	6	1996–97	Memphis
	Alika Smith	6	1995–96	Utah
	Tony Webster	6	1982–83	San Diego State
	Racky Sesler	6	1981–82	Colorado State
	Aaron Strayhorn	6	1979–80	UNLV

== Blocks ==
Career
Rank	Player	Blocks	Seasons
1	Tony Maroney	173	1993–94 1994–95
2	Melton Werts	163	1972–73 1973–74 1974–75 1975–76
3	Haim Shimonovich	143	2000–01 2001–02 2002–03 2003–04
4	Ahmet Gueye	131	2005–06 2006–07
5	Bill Amis	130	2007–08 2008–09 2010–11
6	Vander Joaquim	129	2010–11 2011–12 2012–13
7	Troy Ostler	88	1999–00 2000–01
8	Greg Hicks	86	1982–83 1983–84
9	Bernardo da Silva	84	2019–20 2020–21 2021–22 2022–23 2023–24
10	Mike Robinson	78	1996–97 1997–98 1998–99
	Chris Botez	78	2004–05 2005–06

Season
Rank	Player	Blocks	Season
1	Tony Maroney	103	1993–94
2	Tony Maroney	70	1994–95
3	Melton Werts	68	1972–73
4	Ahmet Gueye	66	2006–07
5	Ahmet Gueye	65	2005–06
6	Haim Shimonovich	62	2001–02
7	Vander Joaquim	58	2011–12
8	Greg Hicks	56	1983–84
9	Troy Ostler	51	2000–01
	Melton Werts	51	1973–74

Single game
Rank	Player	Blocks	Season	Opponent
1	Mike Robinson	8	1998–99	San Jose State
	Tony Maroney	8	1994–95	Utah
	Melton Werts	8	1972–73	San Diego
4	Vander Joaquim	7	2011–12	Nevada
	Ahmet Gueye	7	2006–07	San Jose State
6	Bill Amis	6	2010–11	Nevada
	Bill Amis	6	2008–09	Prairie View A&M
	Tony Maroney	6	1994–95	Boston
	Tony Maroney	6	1994–95	New Mexico
	Tony Maroney	6	1993–94	Mercer
	Ray Reed	6	1990–91	Air Force
