= Riley Wallace =

American retired basketball coach (born 1941)

Biographical details
- Born: October 25, 1941 (age 84); Alton, Illinois, U.S.

Playing career
- 1960–1963: Centenary
- Position: Forward

Coaching career (HC unless noted)
- 1964–1966: Litchfield HS (IL) (assistant)
- 1966–1971: Litchfield HS (IL)
- 1971–1976: Centenary (assistant)
- 1976–1978: Centenary
- 1978–1984: Hawaii (assoc. HC)
- 1984–1987: Seminole JC
- 1987–2007: Hawaii

Administrative career (AD unless noted)
- 1976–1978: Centenary

Head coaching record
- Overall: 349–262 (NCAA Division I); 68–36 (junior college); 69–59 (high school)
- Tournaments: 0–3 (NCAA Division I); 8–6 (NIT)

Accomplishments and honors

Championships
- 3 WAC tournament (1994, 2001, 2002); WAC regular season (2002)

Awards
- 3x WAC Coach of the Year (1989, 1997, 2002)

Robert Riley Wallace (born October 25, 1941) is an American retired basketball coach. He spent most of his career coaching college basketball, and was the head coach of the Hawaii Rainbow Warriors men's team from 1987 through 2007.

== Early life and college playing career ==
Born in Alton, Illinois, Wallace graduated from Jersey Community High School in Jerseyville, Illinois in 1959. After high school, Wallace attended Centenary College of Louisiana and started at forward all three years on the Centenary Gentlemen varsity basketball team from 1960 to 1963. Wallace led Centenary in field goal percentage with at least 8 attempts per game (.450) as a sophomore in 1960–61 and rebounding (222 n the season, 8.5 per game) as a junior in 1961–62.

Wallace graduated from Centenary in 1964 with a Bachelor of Science degree in physical education.

== Coaching career ==
After graduating from Centenary, Wallace became an assistant basketball coach at Litchfield High School in Litchfield, Illinois under Larry Little. Wallace was also track and field head coach at Litchfield High from 1964 to 1967. In 1966, Wallace became head coach and would lead Litchfield for five seasons with a 69–59 record and the 1970 regional title. Wallace completed a Master of Education degree at the University of Illinois at Urbana–Champaign College of Education in 1968.

In 1971, Wallace returned to Centenary College to be assistant basketball coach, again under Larry Little. He became head basketball coach and athletic director in 1976, then resigned midway in the 1977–78 season to be associate head coach at Hawaii, again under Little. Wallace remained in this position until 1984.

From 1984 to 1987, Wallace was head coach at Seminole Junior College in Seminole, Oklahoma and left with a 68–36 record, including consecutive 26–10 seasons.

After coaching at Seminole JC, Wallace returned to Hawaii to be head coach. When Wallace took over the program in 1987, it had suffered through four straight losing seasons, including a combined 11–43 mark during the latter two years. He guided Hawaii to nine of its 12 all-time postseason appearances, including a school-record streak of four straight from 2001 to 2004. The Warriors appeared in the NCAA Tournament three times under Wallace and were invited to the National Invitation Tournament (NIT) on six occasions. Prior to his arrival, the program had just one NCAA appearance and two trips to the NIT.

Wallace announced his resignation following the end of the 2006–07 season on December 29, 2006.

== Head coaching record ==
=== College ===
Record table
Season	Team	Overall	Conference	Standing	Postseason
Centenary Gentlemen (NCAA Division I Independent) (1976–1978)
1976–77	Centenary	11–19			
1977–78	Centenary	4–8*			
Centenary:		15–27			
Hawaii Rainbow Warriors (Western Athletic Conference) (1987–2007)
1987–88	Hawaii	4–25	2–14	9th	
1988–89	Hawaii	17–13	9–7	4th	NIT First Round
1989–90	Hawaii	25–10	10–6	T–3rd	NIT Quarterfinals
1990–91	Hawaii	16–13	7–9	T–5th	
1991–92	Hawaii	16–12	9–7	T–4th	
1992–93	Hawaii	12–16	7–11	T–7th	
1993–94	Hawaii	18–15	11–7	4th	NCAA Division I First Round
1994–95	Hawaii	16–13	8–10	6th	
1995–96	Hawaii	10–18	7–11	8th	
1996–97	Hawaii	21–8	12–4	T–1st (Pacific)	NIT Second Round
1997–98	Hawaii	21–9	8–6	4th (Pacific)	NIT Quarterfinals
1998–99	Hawaii	6–20	3–11	7th (Pacific)	
1999–2000	Hawaii	17–12	5–9	6th	
2000–01	Hawaii	17–14	8–8	T–5th	NCAA Division I First Round
2001–02	Hawaii	27–6	15–3	T–1st	NCAA Division I First Round
2002–03	Hawaii	19–12	9–9	T–6th	NIT Second Round
2003–04	Hawaii	21–12	11–7	5th	NIT Quarterfinals
2004–05	Hawaii	16–13	7–11	7th	
2005–06	Hawaii	17–11	10–6	T–4th	
2006–07	Hawaii	18–13	8–8	T–5th	
Hawaii:		334–265	166–164		
Total:		349–292			
National champion Postseason invitational champion Conference regular season champion Conference regular season and conference tournament champion Division regular season champion Division regular season and conference tournament champion Conference tournament champion

*Resigned in January 1978 to become associate head coach at Hawaii.

=== Junior college ===
Record table
Season	Team	Overall	Conference	Standing	Postseason
Seminole (OK) Trojans (Bi-State Conference) (1984–1987)
1984–85	Seminole (OK)	26–10			
1985–86	Seminole (OK)	26–10			
1986–87	Seminole (OK)	16–16			
Seminole (OK):		68–36			
Total:		68–36			
National champion Postseason invitational champion Conference regular season champion Conference regular season and conference tournament champion Division regular season champion Division regular season and conference tournament champion Conference tournament champion
