= 2000–01 Fresno State Bulldogs men's basketball team =

American college basketball season

2000–01 Fresno State Bulldogs men's basketball

WAC tournament champions

NCAA tournament, second round
- Conference: Western Athletic Conference
- Record: 26–7 (13–3 WAC)
- Head coach: Jerry Tarkanian (6th season)
- Home arena: Selland Arena

2000–01 WAC men's basketball standings
	Conf.				Overall
Team	W		L	PCT	W		L	PCT
Fresno State	13	–	3	.813	26	–	7	.788
Tulsa	10	–	6	.625	26	–	11	.703
UTEP	10	–	6	.625	23	–	9	.719
TCU	9	–	7	.563	20	–	11	.645
Hawaii †	8	–	8	.500	17	–	14	.548
SMU	8	–	8	.500	18	–	12	.600
San Jose State	6	–	10	.375	14	–	14	.500
Rice	5	–	11	.313	14	–	16	.467
Nevada	3	–	13	.188	10	–	18	.357
† 2001 WAC tournament winner

The 2000–01 Fresno State Bulldogs men's basketball team represented California State University, Fresno during the 2000–01 NCAA Division I men's basketball season. This was head coach Jerry Tarkanian's sixth season at Fresno State. The Bulldogs played their home games at Selland Arena and were members of the Western Athletic Conference. They finished the season 26–7, 13–3 in WAC play to finish in first place. They defeated Tulsa to win the WAC tournament and earn the conference's automatic bid to the NCAA tournament. The Bulldogs beat No. 8 seed California in the first round before losing to No. 1 seed and eventual Final Four participant Michigan State.

== Roster ==
2000–01 Fresno State Bulldogs men's basketball team
Players
Coaches

Pos.	#	Name	Height	Weight	Year	Previous school	Hometown
G	5	Demetrius Porter	6 ft 0 in (1.83 m)	180 lb (82 kg)	Sr
F	12	Noel Felix	6 ft 9 in (2.06 m)	215 lb (98 kg)	So	Inglewood	Inglewood, California
G	22	Travis Demanby	6 ft 4 in (1.93 m)	175 lb (79 kg)	So		Medford, Oregon
C	33	Melvin Ely	6 ft 10 in (2.08 m)	255 lb (116 kg)	Jr	Thornton Township	Harvey, Illinois

Head coach

- Jerry Tarkanian (Fresno State)

Assistant coach(es)

Legend

- (C) Team captain
- (S) Suspended
- (I) Ineligible
- (W) Walk-on
- Injured
- Current redshirt

Roster

== Schedule and results ==
Date time, TV	Rank^{#}	Opponent^{#}	Result	Record	Site (attendance) city, state
Non-conference regular season
Nov 22, 2000*		vs. NC State	W 82–63	2–1	Springfield Civic Center; Springfield, Massachusetts
WAC regular season
Mar 3, 2001		Tulsa	W 84–77	24–5 (13–3)	Selland Arena; Fresno, California
WAC tournament
Mar 8, 2001*		vs. Rice; Quarterfinals	W 60–52	25–5	Donald W. Reynolds Center; Tulsa, Oklahoma
Mar 9, 2001*		vs. Hawaii; Semifinals	L 67–76	25–6	Donald W. Reynolds Center; Tulsa, Oklahoma
NCAA tournament
Mar 16, 2001*	(9 MW)	vs. (8 MW) California; First Round	W 82–70	26–6	The Pyramid; Memphis, Tennessee
Mar 18, 2001*	(9 MW)	vs. (1 MW) No. 3 Michigan State; Second Round	L 65–81	26–7	The Pyramid; Memphis, Tennessee
*Non-conference game. ^{#}Rankings from AP Poll. (#) Tournament seedings in parentheses. S=South. All times are in Pacific Time.

== Awards and honors ==
- Melvin Ely – WAC Player of the Year
