= 2000–01 Hawaii Rainbow Warriors basketball team =

American college basketball season

2000–01 Hawaii Rainbow Warriors basketball

WAC Tournament champion

NCAA, First Round
- Conference: Western Athletic Conference
- Record: 17–14 (8–8 WAC)
- Head coach: Riley Wallace (14th season)
- Associate head coach: Bob Nash (14th season)
- Assistant coaches: Jackson Wheeler (11th season); Scott Rigot (2nd season)
- Home arena: Stan Sheriff Center

2000–01 WAC men's basketball standings
	Conf.				Overall
Team	W		L	PCT	W		L	PCT
Fresno State	13	–	3	.813	26	–	7	.788
Tulsa	10	–	6	.625	26	–	11	.703
UTEP	10	–	6	.625	23	–	9	.719
TCU	9	–	7	.563	20	–	11	.645
Hawaii †	8	–	8	.500	17	–	14	.548
SMU	8	–	8	.500	18	–	12	.600
San Jose State	6	–	10	.375	14	–	14	.500
Rice	5	–	11	.313	14	–	16	.467
Nevada	3	–	13	.188	10	–	18	.357
† 2001 WAC tournament winner

The 2000–01 Hawaii Rainbow Warriors basketball team represented the University of Hawaiʻi at Mānoa in the 2000–01 NCAA Division I men's basketball season. The Rainbow Warriors, led by head coach Riley Wallace, played their home games at the Stan Sheriff Center in Honolulu, Hawaii, as members of the Western Athletic Conference. The Rainbow Warriors finished 5th in the WAC during the regular season, but landed three upset victories in three days during the WAC tournament, finishing with a 78–72 overtime victory over host Tulsa in the championship game.

As WAC tournament champions, Hawaii earned an automatic bid to the NCAA tournament, and were given the 12th seed in the Midwest region. The Rainbow Warriors were eliminated in the first round of the tournament, losing to Syracuse, 79–69.

== Roster ==
2000–01 Hawaii Rainbow Warriors men's basketball team
Players
Coaches

Pos.	#	Name	Height	Weight	Year	Hometown
G/F	1	Predrag Savović	6 ft 6 in (1.98 m)	—	Jr	Herceg Novi, Yugoslavia
F	2	Phil Martin	6 ft 7 in (2.01 m)	—	RS Fr	Hamilton, Ontario, Canada
G	3	Mike McIntyre	6 ft 3 in (1.91 m)	—	Jr	Long Beach, California
F	4	Boško Radović	6 ft 9 in (2.06 m)	—	Fr	Titograd, Yugoslavia
G	5	David Hilton	5 ft 11 in (1.8 m)	—	Fr	New York, New York
G	10	Lance Takaki	5 ft 4 in (1.63 m)	—	So	Honolulu, Hawaii
G	12	Ricky Terrell	6 ft 3 in (1.91 m)	—	Jr	Los Angeles, California
F/C	14	Haim Shimonovich	6 ft 10 in (2.08 m)	—	Fr	Rishon LeZion, Israel
F	21	Mindaugas Burneika	6 ft 7 in (2.01 m)	—	Jr	Kaunas, Lithuania
G/F	22	Nerijus Puida	6 ft 5 in (1.96 m)	—	Sr	Šakiai, Lithuania
G	23	Carl English	6 ft 4 in (1.93 m)	—	Fr	Patrick's Cove, Newfoundland, Canada
F	24	Troy Olster	6 ft 10 in (2.08 m)	—	Sr	West Valley City, Utah
G	25	Ryne Holliday	5 ft 10 in (1.78 m)	—	So	Belleville, Illinois
F	33	Lane O'Conner	6 ft 7 in (2.01 m)	—	Sr	Vancouver, Washington
C	34	Todd Fields	7 ft 0 in (2.13 m)	—	Sr	Mesquite, Texas

Head coach

- Riley Wallace (Centenary)

Assistant coach(es)

- Bob Nash (Hawaiʻi)
- Jackson Wheeler (Marymount (KS))
- Scott Rigot (Buffalo)

Legend

- (C) Team captain
- (S) Suspended
- (I) Ineligible
- (W) Walk-on
- Injured
- Current redshirt

Roster
Last update: January 18, 2023

== Schedule and results ==
Date time, TV	Rank^{#}	Opponent^{#}	Result	Record	Site city, state
Regular season
November 17, 2000*		Louisville	L 71–86	0–1	Stan Sheriff Center (6,776); Honolulu, HI
November 24, 2000*		Southeastern Louisiana; United Airlines Tip-Off Tournament	W 59–55	1–1	Stan Sheriff Center (5,922); Honolulu, HI
November 26, 2000*		San Diego; United Airlines Tip-Off Tournament	L 63–66	1–2	Stan Sheriff Center (5,744); Honolulu, HI
December 9, 2000*		at UCLA	L 64–84	1–3	Pauley Pavilion (6,604); Los Angeles, CA
December 16, 2000*		Texas–Pan American	W 86–73	2–3	Stan Sheriff Center (5,755); Honolulu, HI
December 21, 2000*		Georgia State; Nike Festival	L 64–65	2–4	Stan Sheriff Center (5,781); Honolulu, HI
December 22, 2000*		Cal State Northridge; Nike Festival	W 76–70	3–4	Stan Sheriff Center (5,727); Honolulu, HI
December 23, 2000*		UAB; Nike Festival	W 100–86	4–4	Stan Sheriff Center (5,794); Honolulu, HI
December 27, 2000*		Manhattan; Rainbow Classic	W 81–67	5–4	Stan Sheriff Center (7,350); Honolulu, HI
December 29, 2000*		Saint Louis; Rainbow Classic	W 75–67	6–4	Stan Sheriff Center (8,088); Honolulu, HI
December 30, 2000*		No. 6 Tennessee; Rainbow Classic	L 58–69	6–5	Stan Sheriff Center (8,291); Honolulu, HI
January 4, 2001		at TCU	L 64–103	6–6 (0–1)	Daniel–Meyer Coliseum (3,825); Fort Worth, TX
January 6, 2001		at SMU	L 56–69	6–7 (0–2)	Moody Coliseum (2,306); Dallas, Texas
January 11, 2001		UTEP	L 71–79	6–8 (0–3)	Stan Sheriff Center (5,875); Honolulu, HI
January 13, 2001		Tulsa	W 68–65	7–8 (1–3)	Stan Sheriff Center (6,301); Honolulu, HI
January 20, 2001		San Jose State	W 65–64	8–8 (2–3)	Stan Sheriff Center (6,438); Honolulu, HI
January 25, 2001		at Rice	L 64–70	8–9 (2–4)	Rice Gymnasium (2,514); Houston, Texas
January 28, 2001		at Tulsa	L 67–79	8–10 (2–5)	Reynolds Center (8,096); Tulsa, OK
February 1, 2001		No. 19 Fresno State	W 91–73	9–10 (3–5)	Stan Sheriff Center (6,249); Honolulu, HI
February 3, 2001		Nevada	W 76–69	10–10 (4–5)	Stan Sheriff Center (6,567); Honolulu, HI
February 8, 2001		at Nevada	L 60–73	10–11 (4–6)	Lawlor Events Center (5,674); Reno, NV
February 11, 2001		at No. 23 Fresno State	L 63–86	10–12 (4–7)	Selland Arena (10,220); Fresno, CA
February 15, 2001		SMU	W 79–65	11–12 (5–7)	Stan Sheriff Center (5,988); Honolulu, HI
February 17, 2001		Rice	W 61–53	12–12 (6–7)	Stan Sheriff Center (7,130); Honolulu, HI
February 22, 2001		TCU	W 102–87	13–12 (7–7)	Stan Sheriff Center (7,025); Honolulu, HI
March 1, 2001		at San Jose State	W 71–61	14–12 (8–7)	Event Center Arena (1,041); San Jose, CA
March 3, 2001		at UTEP	L 77–85	14–13 (8–8)	Don Haskins Center (12,222); El Paso, TX
WAC tournament
March 8, 2001	(5)	vs. (4) TCU; WAC Quarterfinals	W 99–79	15–13	Reynolds Center (2,759); Tulsa, OK
March 9, 2001	(5)	vs. (1) No. 25 Fresno State; WAC Semifinals	W 76–67	16–13	Reynolds Center (7,669); Tulsa, OK
March 10, 2001	(5)	at (2) Tulsa; WAC Championship	W 78–72	17–13	Reynolds Center (8,160); Tulsa, OK
NCAA tournament
March 16, 2001	(12 MW)	vs. No. 17 Syracuse; NCAA First Round	L 69–79	17–14	UD Arena (13,133); Dayton, OH
*Non-conference game. ^{#}Rankings from AP Poll. (#) Tournament seedings in parentheses. All times are in Hawaiian Time.
