= United Athletic Conference men's basketball tournament =

Men's basketball championship

- Conference basketball championship
- Sport: College basketball
- Conference: United Athletic Conference
- Number of teams: 9
- Format: Single-elimination tournament
- Current stadium: Credit Union of Texas Event Center
- Current location: Allen, Texas
- Played: 1984–present
- Last contest: 2026
- Current champion: California Baptist
- Most championships: New Mexico State Aggies (10 titles)
- Official website: uacsports.com/mbball

The United Athletic Conference men's basketball tournament is the conference championship tournament in men's basketball for the United Athletic Conference (UAC). The conference used to be known as the Western Athletic Conference (WAC), which was founded in 1962, but the annual tournament has only been held since 1984.

The winner of the tournament is guaranteed a spot in the NCAA basketball tournament every year

== Format and host ==
The event has alternated between being hosted at campus sites and neutral sites throughout its history. From the inaugural event in 1984 until 1992 the regular season champion hosted the tournament, but in 1993 and 1994 the event was held at the Delta Center in Salt Lake City which, although located less than five miles from then-conference member Utah's campus, was considered a neutral site. From 1995 through 2009 the event returned to on-campus sites, although the location was awarded through a predetermined bidding process rather than being given to the regular-season champion. From 2010 to 2026 the tournament was again held at a neutral site, namely Orleans Arena in Paradise, Nevada. After the conference rebranded to the UAC in 2026, the site was moved to Allen, Texas at the Credit Union of Texas Event Center.

Starting with the 2023 tournament, the WAC adopted a new seeding system based on advanced team metrics, developed in large part by statistical guru Ken Pomeroy. Tournament entry will still be based on conference record.

== Tournament results ==
Year	Champion	Score	Runner-up	Tournament MVP	Location
1984	UTEP	62–55	New Mexico	Juden Smith, UTEP	Special Events Center (El Paso, Texas)
1985	San Diego State	87–81	UTEP	Luster Goodwin, UTEP	Special Events Center (El Paso, Texas)
1986	UTEP	65–64	Wyoming	Eric Leckner, Wyoming	Arena-Auditorium (Laramie, Wyoming)
1987	Wyoming	64–62	New Mexico	Eric Leckner, Wyoming	The Pit (Albuquerque, New Mexico)
1988	Wyoming	79–75	UTEP	Eric Leckner, Wyoming	Marriott Center (Provo, Utah)
1989	UTEP	73–60	Colorado State	Tim Hardaway, UTEP	Jon M. Huntsman Center (Salt Lake City, Utah)
1990	UTEP	75–58	Hawaii	Greg Foster, UTEP	Special Events Center (El Paso, Texas)
1991	BYU	51–49	Utah	Shawn Bradley, BYU	Arena-Auditorium (Laramie, Wyoming)
1992	BYU	73–71	UTEP	Eddie Rivera, UTEP	Moby Arena (Fort Collins, Colorado)
1993	New Mexico	76–65	UTEP	Ike Williams, New Mexico	Delta Center (Salt Lake City)
1994	Hawaii	73–66	BYU	Trevor Ruffin, Hawaii	Delta Center (Salt Lake City)
1995	Utah	67–54	Hawaii	Keith Van Horn, Utah	The Pit (Albuquerque, New Mexico)
1996	New Mexico	64–60	Utah	Kenny Thomas, New Mexico	The Pit (Albuquerque, New Mexico)
1997	Utah	89–68	TCU	Keith Van Horn, Utah	Thomas & Mack Center (Paradise, Nevada)
1998	UNLV	56–51	New Mexico	Kenny Thomas, New Mexico	Thomas & Mack Center (Paradise, Nevada)
1999	Utah	60–45	New Mexico	Alex Jensen, Utah	Thomas & Mack Center (Paradise, Nevada)
2000	Fresno State	75–72	Tulsa	Courtney Alexander, Fresno State	Selland Arena (Fresno, California)
2001	Hawaii	78–72	Tulsa	Carl English, Hawaii	Reynolds Center, Tulsa, Oklahoma
2002	Hawaii	73–59	Tulsa	Predrag Savović, Hawaii	Reynolds Center, Tulsa, Oklahoma
2003	Tulsa	75–64	Nevada	Kevin Johnson, Tulsa	Reynolds Center, Tulsa, Oklahoma
2004	Nevada	66–60	UTEP	Kirk Snyder, Nevada	Save Mart Center (Fresno, California)
2005	UTEP	91–78	Boise State	Filiberto Rivera, UTEP	Lawlor Events Center (Reno, Nevada)
2006	Nevada	70–63	Utah State	Nick Fazekas, Nevada	Lawlor Events Center (Reno, Nevada)
2007	New Mexico State	72–70	Utah State	Justin Hawkins, New Mexico State	Pan American Center (Las Cruces, New Mexico)
2008	Boise State	107–102 ^{3OT}	New Mexico State	Reggie Larry, Boise State	Pan American Center (Las Cruces, New Mexico)
2009	Utah State	72–62	Nevada	Gary Wilkinson, Utah State	Lawlor Events Center (Reno, Nevada)
2010	New Mexico State	69–63	Utah State	Jahmar Young, New Mexico State	Lawlor Events Center (Reno, Nevada)
2011	Utah State	77–69	Boise State	Brockeith Pane, Utah State	Orleans Arena (Paradise, Nevada)
2012	New Mexico State	82–57	Louisiana Tech	Wendell McKines, New Mexico State	Orleans Arena (Paradise, Nevada)
2013	New Mexico State	64–55	Texas–Arlington	Sim Bhullar, New Mexico State	Orleans Arena (Paradise, Nevada)
2014	New Mexico State	77–55	Idaho	Sim Bhullar, New Mexico State	Orleans Arena (Paradise, Nevada)
2015	New Mexico State	80–61	Seattle	Tshilidzi Nephawe, New Mexico State	Orleans Arena (Paradise, Nevada)
2016	Cal State Bakersfield	57–54	New Mexico State	Dedrick Basile, Cal State Bakersfield	Orleans Arena (Paradise, Nevada)
2017	New Mexico State	70–60	Cal State Bakersfield	Ian Baker, New Mexico State	Orleans Arena (Paradise, Nevada)
2018	New Mexico State	72–58	Grand Canyon	Jemerrio Jones, New Mexico State	Orleans Arena (Paradise, Nevada)
2019	New Mexico State	89–57	Grand Canyon	Trevelin Queen, New Mexico State	Orleans Arena (Paradise, Nevada)
2020	Cancelled due to the coronavirus pandemic				
2021	Grand Canyon	74–56	New Mexico State	Jovan Blacksher, Grand Canyon	Orleans Arena (Paradise, Nevada)
2022	New Mexico State	66–52	Abilene Christian	Teddy Allen, New Mexico State	Orleans Arena (Paradise, Nevada)
2023	Grand Canyon	84–66	Southern Utah	Rayshon Harrison, Grand Canyon	Orleans Arena (Paradise, Nevada)
2024	Grand Canyon	89–74	UT Arlington	Tyon Grant-Foster, Grand Canyon	Orleans Arena (Paradise, Nevada)
2025	Grand Canyon	89–82	Utah Valley	JaKobe Coles, Grand Canyon	Orleans Arena (Paradise, Nevada)
2026	California Baptist	63–61	Utah Valley	Dominique Daniels Jr., California Baptist	Orleans Arena (Paradise, Nevada)

== Tournament Championships by School ==
=== Current members ===
Current members as of July 1, 2026

School	Championships	Championship Years
Abilene Christian	0	
Austin Peay	0	
Central Arkansas	0	
Eastern Kentucky	0	
Little Rock	0	
North Alabama	0	
Tarleton State	0	
UT Arlington	0	
West Georgia	0	

=== Former members ===
Former members that have won the tournament as of July 1, 2026.

School	Championships	Championship Years
New Mexico State	10	2007, 2010, 2012, 2013, 2014, 2015, 2017, 2018, 2019, 2022
UTEP	5	1984, 1986, 1989, 1990, 2005
Grand Canyon	4	2021, 2023, 2024, 2025
Hawaii	3	1994, 2001, 2002
Utah	3	1995, 1997, 1999
BYU	2	1991, 1992
Nevada	2	2004, 2006
New Mexico	2	1993, 1996
Utah State	2	2009, 2011
Wyoming	2	1987, 1988
Boise State	1	2008
Cal State Bakersfield	1	2016
Fresno State	1	2000
San Diego State	1	1985
Tulsa	1	2003
UNLV	1	1998
California Baptist	1	2026

== Broadcasters ==
=== Television ===
Year	Network	Play-by-play	Analyst
1984	NBC	Charlie Jones	Dan Belluomini
1985	Lorimar Sports Network	Larry Zimmer	Irv Brown
1990	TSI Sports	Carl Arky	Irv Brown
1992	ESPN	Craig Bolerjack	Terry Holland
2007	ESPN2	Terry Gannon	Stephen Bardo
2008	ESPN2	Dave Pasch	Michael Holton
2009	ESPN2	Terry Gannon	Stephen Bardo
2010	ESPN2	Terry Gannon	Stephen Bardo
2011	ESPN2	Dave Flemming	Sean Farnham
2012	ESPN2	Dave Flemming	Sean Farnham
2013	ESPNU	Trey Bender	Stephen Howard
2014	ESPNU	Steve Quis	Jon Crispin
2015	ESPNU	Steve Quis	Sean Harrington
2016	ESPNU	Dave Flemming	Malcolm Huckaby
2017	ESPNU	Eric Rothman	Paul Biancardi
2018	ESPNU	Kanoa Leahey	Corey Williams
2019	ESPNU	Kanoa Leahey	Adrian Branch
2020	ESPNU	Dave Feldman	Corey Williams
2021	ESPNU	Roxy Bernstein	Adrian Branch
2022	ESPNU	Dave Flemming	Mike O'Donnell
2023	ESPN2	Dave Feldman	Mike O'Donnell
2024	ESPN2	Dave Feldman	Mike O'Donnell
2025	ESPN2	Dave Feldman	Jerod Haase
2026	ESPN2	Lowell Galindo	Tim Welsh

=== Radio ===
Year	Network	Play-by-play	Analyst
2010	Westwood One	Dave Sims	Kyle Macy
2011	Westwood One		
2012	Dial Global Sports	Kevin Calabro	Tom Brennan

== See also ==
- United Athletic Conference women's basketball tournament
