= 2001–02 Hawaii Rainbow Warriors basketball team =

American college basketball season

2001–02 Hawaii Rainbow Warriors basketball

WAC Regular Season co-champion WAC Tournament champion

NCAA tournament, First Round
- Conference: Western Athletic Conference

Ranking
- AP: No. 25
- Record: 27–6 (15–3 WAC)
- Head coach: Riley Wallace (15th season)
- Associate head coach: Bob Nash (15th season)
- Assistant coaches: Jackson Wheeler (12th season); Scott Rigot (3rd season)
- Home arena: Stan Sheriff Center

2001–02 WAC men's basketball standings
| | Conf. | | | | Overall |
| Team | W | | L | PCT | W | | L | PCT |
|---|---|---|---|---|---|---|---|---|
| No. 25 Hawaii † | 15 | – | 3 | .833 | 27 | – | 6 | .818 |
| Tulsa | 15 | – | 3 | .833 | 27 | – | 7 | .794 |
| Louisiana Tech | 14 | – | 4 | .778 | 22 | – | 10 | .688 |
| SMU | 10 | – | 8 | .556 | 15 | – | 14 | .517 |
| Nevada | 9 | – | 9 | .500 | 17 | – | 13 | .567 |
| Fresno State | 9 | – | 9 | .500 | 19 | – | 15 | .559 |
| Boise State | 6 | – | 12 | .333 | 13 | – | 17 | .433 |
| Rice | 5 | – | 13 | .278 | 10 | – | 19 | .345 |
| San Jose State | 4 | – | 14 | .222 | 10 | – | 22 | .313 |
| UTEP | 3 | – | 15 | .167 | 10 | – | 22 | .313 |
† 2002 WAC tournament winner Rankings from AP Poll

The 2001–02 Hawaii Rainbow Warriors basketball team represented the University of Hawaiʻi at Mānoa in the 2001–02 NCAA Division I men's basketball season. The Rainbow Warriors, led by head coach Riley Wallace, played their home games at the Stan Sheriff Center in Honolulu, Hawaii, as members of the Western Athletic Conference. The Rainbow Warriors shared the WAC regular season championship with Tulsa, and earned the top seed in the WAC tournament. Hawaii won all three games in the WAC tournament by double figures, winning the WAC tournament for the second straight year with a 73–59 victory over Tulsa.

As WAC tournament champions, Hawaii earned an automatic bid to the NCAA tournament, and were given the 10th seed in the West region. The Rainbow Warriors were eliminated in the first round of the tournament, losing to Xavier, 70–58.

The Rainbow Warriors finished the season with a record of 27–6, which was a school record for most wins in a single season.

== Roster ==
2001–02 Hawaii Rainbow Warriors men's basketball team
Players
Coaches

| Pos. | # | Name | Height | Weight | Year | Hometown |
|---|---|---|---|---|---|---|
| G | 1 | Predrag Savović | 6 ft 6 in (1.98 m) | — | Sr | Herceg Novi, Yugoslavia |
| F | 2 | Phil Martin | 6 ft 8 in (2.03 m) | — | So | Hamilton, Ontario, Canada |
| G | 3 | Mike McIntyre | 6 ft 3 in (1.91 m) | — | Sr | Long Beach, California |
| G | 10 | Lance Takaki | 5 ft 4 in (1.63 m) | — | Jr | Honolulu, Hawaii |
| F | 11 | Joshua Stanhiser | 6 ft 9 in (2.06 m) | — | Jr | Loma Linda, California |
| C | 12 | Milos Zivanovic | 6 ft 11 in (2.11 m) | — | Fr | Belgrade, Serbia and Montenegro |
| F/C | 14 | Haim Shimonovich | 6 ft 10 in (2.08 m) | — | So | Rishon LeZion, Israel |
| G | 15 | Mark Campbell | 6 ft 4 in (1.93 m) | — | Jr | Mount Vernon, Washington |
| F | 21 | Mindaugas Burneika | 6 ft 7 in (2.01 m) | — | Sr | Kaunas, Lithuania |
| G | 23 | Carl English | 6 ft 5 in (1.96 m) | — | So | Patrick's Cove, Newfoundland, Canada |
| G | 25 | Ryne Holliday | 6 ft 1 in (1.85 m) | — | Jr | Belleville, Illinois |
| F | 40 | Paul Jesinskis | 6 ft 8 in (2.03 m) | — | Jr | Assagay, South Africa |
| F | 43 | Luc-Arthur Vebobe | 6 ft 9 in (2.06 m) | — | Jr | Antibes, France |
| F | 54 | Nkeruwem Akpan | 6 ft 8 in (2.03 m) | — | Fr | Akwa Ibom, Nigeria |

Head coach

- Riley Wallace (Centenary)

Assistant coach(es)

- Bob Nash (Hawaiʻi)
- Jackson Wheeler (Marymount (KS))
- Scott Rigot (Buffalo)

Legend

- (C) Team captain
- (S) Suspended
- (I) Ineligible
- (W) Walk-on
- Injured
- Current redshirt

Roster
Last update: January 19, 2023

== Schedule and results ==
| Date time, TV | Rank^{#} | Opponent^{#} | Result | Record | Site (attendance) city, state |
Exhibition
| November 11, 2001*; 7:30 pm | | EA Sports West All–Stars | W 85–81 | — | Stan Sheriff Center; Honolulu, HI |
Regular season
| November 16, 2001*; 7:30 pm | | Norfolk State; Nike Tip-Off Tournament | W 76–52 | 1–0 | Stan Sheriff Center (6,010); Honolulu, HI |
| November 18, 2001*; 7:30 pm | | Drake; Nike Tip-Off Tournament | W 74–63 | 2–0 | Stan Sheriff Center (5,644); Honolulu, HI |
| November 23, 2001*; 5:00 pm | | vs. Mercer; Big Island Invitational | W 89–72 | 3–0 | Afook-Chinen Civic Auditorium (1,075); Hilo, HI |
| November 24, 2001*; 5:00 pm | | vs. Colorado State; Big Island Invitational | L 59–61 | 3–1 | Afook-Chinen Civic Auditorium (687); Hilo, HI |
| November 25, 2001*; 2:00 pm | | vs. Wisconsin; Big Island Invitational | W 60–57 | 4–1 | Afook-Chinen Civic Auditorium (312); Hilo, HI |
| November 27, 2001*; 7:00 pm | | Northwestern State | W 60–58 | 5–1 | Stan Sheriff Center (5,488); Honolulu, HI |
| December 10, 2001*; 7:00 pm | | Alcorn State | W 62–48 | 6–1 | Stan Sheriff Center (5,543); Honolulu, HI |
| December 14, 2001*; 7:00 pm | | San Diego State | L 58–61 | 6–2 | Stan Sheriff Center (6,443); Honolulu, HI |
| December 19, 2001*; 7:30 pm | | Portland; Rainbow Classic | W 75–68 | 7–2 | Stan Sheriff Center (6,296); Honolulu, HI |
| December 21, 2001*; 7:30 pm | | Iona; Rainbow Classic | W 67–56 | 8–2 | Stan Sheriff Center (6,515); Honolulu, HI |
| December 22, 2001*; 7:30 pm | | Georgia; Rainbow Classic | W 54–44 | 9–2 | Stan Sheriff Center (7,019); Honolulu, HI |
| December 27, 2001; 7:00 pm | | Fresno State | W 83–73 | 10–2 (1–0) | Stan Sheriff Center (9,175); Honolulu, HI |
| December 29, 2001; 7:00 pm | | Nevada | W 58–40 | 11–2 (2–0) | Stan Sheriff Center (7,232); Honolulu, HI |
| January 3, 2002; 4:00 pm | | at UTEP | W 70–68 | 12–2 (3–0) | Don Haskins Center (6,582); El Paso, TX |
| January 5, 2002; 4:30 pm | | at Boise State | W 64–62 | 13–2 (4–0) | BSU Pavilion (6,806); Boise, ID |
| January 10, 2002; 7:00 pm | | Louisiana Tech | W 81–61 | 14–2 (5–0) | Stan Sheriff Center (6,910); Honolulu, HI |
| January 12, 2002; 7:00 pm | | SMU | W 83–74 | 15–2 (6–0) | Stan Sheriff Center (9,041); Honolulu, HI |
| January 19, 2002; 5:30 pm | | at San Jose State | L 53–57 | 15–3 (6–1) | Event Center Arena (1,653); San Jose, CA |
| January 24, 2002; 3:00 pm | | at Rice | W 88–79 | 16–3 (7–1) | Rice Gymnasium (1,835); Houston, TX |
| January 26, 2002; 3:00 pm | | at Tulsa | W 67–56 | 17–3 (8–1) | Reynolds Center (8,355); Tulsa, OK |
| January 31, 2002; 7:00 pm | | Boise State | W 67–56 | 18–3 (9–1) | Stan Sheriff Center (7,138); Honolulu, HI |
| February 2, 2002; 7:00 pm | | UTEP | W 75–60 | 19–3 (10–1) | Stan Sheriff Center (8,792); Honolulu, HI |
| February 7, 2002; 5:00 pm | | at SMU | W 85–76 | 20–3 (11–1) | Moody Coliseum (3,662); Dallas, Texas |
| February 9, 2002; 12:30 pm | | at Louisiana Tech | L 57–61 | 20–4 (11–2) | Thomas Assembly Center (3,643); Ruston, LA |
| February 16, 2002; 7:00 pm | | San Jose State | W 71–46 | 21–4 (12–2) | Stan Sheriff Center (8,921); Honolulu, HI |
| February 21, 2002; 7:00 pm | | Tulsa | W 86–85 | 22–4 (13–2) | Stan Sheriff Center (10,300); Honolulu, HI |
| February 23, 2002; 7:00 pm | | Rice | W 79–50 | 23–4 (14–2) | Stan Sheriff Center (9,807); Honolulu, HI |
| February 28, 2002; 5:05 pm | | at Nevada | L 69–79 | 23–5 (14–3) | Lawlor Events Center (6,748); Reno, NV |
| March 2, 2002; 5:00 pm | | at Fresno State | W 82–79 | 24–5 (15–3) | Selland Arena (10,220); Fresno, CA |
WAC tournament
| March 7, 2002; 8:00 am | (1) | vs. (9) San Jose State; WAC Quarterfinals | W 71–56 | 25–5 | Reynolds Center (7,760); Tulsa, OK |
| March 8, 2002; 2:00 pm | (1) | vs. (5) Nevada; WAC Semifinals | W 90–68 | 26–5 | Reynolds Center (8,355); Tulsa, OK |
| March 9, 2002; 4:00 pm | (1) | at (2) Tulsa; WAC Championship | W 73–59 | 27–5 | Reynolds Center (8,355); Tulsa, OK |
NCAA tournament
| March 15, 2002; 11:00 am | (10 W) No. 25 | vs. (7 W) No. 22 Xavier; NCAA First Round | L 58–70 | 27–6 | American Airlines Center (19,951); Dallas, TX |
*Non-conference game. ^{#}Rankings from AP Poll. (#) Tournament seedings in parentheses. All times are in Hawaiian Time.
