= 1999–2000 Fresno State Bulldogs men's basketball team =

American college basketball season

1999–2000 Fresno State Bulldogs men's basketball

WAC tournament champions

NCAA tournament, first round
- Conference: Western Athletic Conference
- Record: 24–10 (11–3 WAC)
- Head coach: Jerry Tarkanian (5th season)
- Home arena: Selland Arena

1999–2000 WAC men's basketball standings
	Conf.				Overall
Team	W		L	PCT	W		L	PCT
No. 18 Tulsa	12	–	2	.857	32	–	5	.865
Fresno State †	11	–	3	.786	24	–	10	.706
SMU	9	–	5	.643	21	–	9	.700
TCU	8	–	6	.571	18	–	14	.563
San Jose State	6	–	8	.429	15	–	15	.500
Hawaii	5	–	9	.357	17	–	12	.586
UTEP	4	–	10	.286	13	–	15	.464
Rice	1	–	13	.071	5	–	22	.185
† 2000 WAC tournament winner Rankings from AP Poll

The 1999–2000 Fresno State Bulldogs men's basketball team represented California State University, Fresno during the 1999–2000 NCAA Division I men's basketball season. This was head coach Jerry Tarkanian's fifth season at Fresno State. The Bulldogs played their home games at Selland Arena and were members of the Western Athletic Conference. They finished the season 24–10, 11–3 in WAC play to finish in second place. They defeated No. 14 Tulsa to win the WAC tournament and earn the conference's automatic bid to the NCAA tournament. The Bulldogs lost in the first round to eventual Final Four participant Wisconsin.

== Roster ==
1999–2000 Fresno State Bulldogs men's basketball team
Players
Coaches

Pos.	#	Name	Height	Weight	Year	Previous school	Hometown
G	5	Demetrius Porter	6 ft 0 in (1.83 m)	180 lb (82 kg)	Jr
F	12	Noel Felix	6 ft 9 in (2.06 m)	215 lb (98 kg)	Fr	Inglewood	Inglewood, California
F	21	Larry Abney	6 ft 8 in (2.03 m)	230 lb (104 kg)	Sr	Fresno CC	Nyack, New York
G	22	Travis Demanby	6 ft 4 in (1.93 m)	175 lb (79 kg)	Fr		Medford, Oregon
G	32	Courtney Alexander	6 ft 5 in (1.96 m)	200 lb (91 kg)	RS Sr	Virginia	Bridgeport, Connecticut
C	33	Melvin Ely	6 ft 10 in (2.08 m)	255 lb (116 kg)	So	Thornton Township	Harvey, Illinois
F	44	Terrance Roberson	6 ft 7 in (2.01 m)	215 lb (98 kg)	Sr	Buena Vista	Saginaw, Michigan

Head coach

- Jerry Tarkanian (Fresno State)

Assistant coach(es)

Legend

- (C) Team captain
- (S) Suspended
- (I) Ineligible
- (W) Walk-on
- Injured
- Current redshirt

Roster

== Schedule and results ==
Date time, TV	Rank^{#}	Opponent^{#}	Result	Record	Site (attendance) city, state
Non-conference regular season
Nov 19, 1999*		at Georgia State	W 74–64	1–0	GSU Sports Arena (3,763); Atlanta, Georgia
Nov 23, 1999*		Pepperdine	L 68–70	1–1	Selland Arena (10,220); Fresno, California
Nov 26, 1999*		vs. Florida International; Hawai'i Thanksgiving Tournament	W 90–75	2–1	Neal S. Blaisdell Center (500); Honolulu, Hawaii
Nov 27, 1999*		vs. Missouri State; Hawai'i Thanksgiving Tournament	W 100–90	3–1	Neal S. Blaisdell Center (500); Honolulu, Hawaii
Nov 28, 1999*		vs. LSU; Hawai'i Thanksgiving Tournament	L 85–95	3–2	Neal S. Blaisdell Center (500); Honolulu, Hawaii
Nov 30, 1999*		Cal State Northridge	L 66–69	3–3	Selland Arena (10,220); Fresno, California
Dec 4, 1999*		Northern Arizona	W 74–68	4–3	Selland Arena (10,220); Fresno, California
Dec 8, 1999*		San Francisco	L 59–69	4–4	Selland Arena (10,220); Fresno, California
Dec 11, 1999*		at UAB; Hardwood Classic	L 99–103 ^{OT}	4–5	Birmingham–Jefferson Civic Center (13,141); Birmingham, Alabama
Dec 14, 1999*		Santa Clara	W 95–67	5–5	Selland Arena (10,220); Fresno, California
Dec 16, 1999*		Florida Atlantic	W 98–80	6–5	Selland Arena (10,220); Fresno, California
Dec 18, 1999*		at Pacific	W 69–63 ^{OT}	7–5	Alex G. Spanos Center (4,230); Stockton, California
Dec 21, 1999*		Wagner	W 95–73	8–5	Selland Arena (10,220); Fresno, California
Dec 22, 1999*		Cornell	W 105–86	9–5	Selland Arena (10,220); Fresno, California
Jan 4, 2000*		at Utah State	L 66–83	9–6	Dee Glen Smith Spectrum (5,619); Logan, Utah
Jan 7, 2000*		High Point	W 96–65	10–6	Selland Arena (10,220); Fresno, California
WAC regular season
Jan 15, 2000		UTEP	W 91–79	11–6 (1–0)	Selland Arena (10,220); Fresno, California
Jan 20, 2000		at TCU	W 101–96	12–6 (2–0)	Daniel-Meyer Coliseum (4,951); Fort Worth, Texas
Jan 22, 2000		at SMU	L 78–85	12–7 (2–1)	Moody Coliseum (6,265); Dallas, Texas
Jan 27, 2000		Rice	W 86–53	13–7 (3–1)	Selland Arena (10,220); Fresno, California
Jan 29, 2000		No. 13 Tulsa	W 75–73	14–7 (4–1)	Selland Arena (10,220); Fresno, California
Feb 3, 2000		at San Jose State	W 82–76 ^{OT}	15–7 (5–1)	The Event Center (4,033); San Jose, California
Feb 6, 2000		at Hawaii	W 85–77	16–7 (6–1)	Stan Sheriff Center (7,904); Honolulu, Hawaii
Feb 12, 2000		at UTEP	L 78–92	16–8 (6–2)	Don Haskins Center (8,092); El Paso, Texas
Feb 17, 2000		SMU	L 75–85	16–9 (6–3)	Selland Arena (10,220); Fresno, California
Feb 20, 2000		TCU	W 98–93	17–9 (7–3)	Selland Arena (10,220); Fresno, California
Feb 24, 2000		at No. 12 Tulsa	W 73–72	18–9 (8–3)	Donald W. Reynolds Center (8,355); Tulsa, Oklahoma
Feb 26, 2000		at Rice	W 69–57	19–9 (9–3)	Tudor Fieldhouse (1,914); Houston, Texas
Mar 1, 2000		San Jose State	W 77–74	20–9 (10–3)	Selland Arena (10,220); Fresno, California
Mar 4, 2000		Hawaii	W 79–69	21–9 (11–3)	Selland Arena (10,220); Fresno, California
WAC tournament
Mar 9, 2000*		UTEP; Quarterfinals	W 79–70	22–9	Selland Arena (9,757); Fresno, California
Mar 10, 2000*		Hawaii; Semifinals	W 103–100 ^{2OT}	23–9	Selland Arena (9,668); Fresno, California
Mar 11, 2000*		No. 14 Tulsa; Championship Game	W 75–72	24–9	Selland Arena (10,021); Fresno, California
NCAA tournament
Mar 16, 2000*; CBS	(9 W)	vs. (8 W) Wisconsin; First Round	L 56–66	24–10	Jon M. Huntsman Center (13,464); Salt Lake City, Utah
*Non-conference game. ^{#}Rankings from AP Poll. (#) Tournament seedings in parentheses. W=West Region. All times are in Pacific Time.

== Awards and honors ==
- Courtney Alexander – WAC Player of the Year
