= Gavin Smith (film studio executive) =

American basketball player, actor, and executive

- Picture distributed by LA County Sheriff's Department to help find Smith
- Born: December 10, 1954; San Fernando Valley, California, US
- Disappeared: May 1, 2012 (aged 57); Oak Park, California, US
- Status: Originally declared dead in absentia until Smith's body was discovered on October 26, 2014
- Body discovered: October 26, 2014; Palmdale, California
- Education: UCLA, Hawaii
- Occupation: Executive at 20th Century Fox
- Known for: Member of 1975 NCAA champion men's basketball team; single-season scoring record at Hawaii
- Height: 198 cm (6 ft 6 in)

Gavin Smith (December 10, 1954 – May 2012) was an American college basketball star, actor, stuntman, and film studio executive, formerly a regional manager of distribution for 20th Century Fox for 18 years. He disappeared under suspicious circumstances in 2012, and was later declared dead before his remains were found in 2014 and a suspect identified and convicted in 2017 for Smith's murder.

Prior to his film industry career, Smith played basketball at UCLA, where he was part of the 1975 team that won that year's NCAA championship, the last for coach John Wooden. Smith later played at Hawaii, where he set the school's single-season scoring record of 23.4 points per game which remained undefeated as of 2012. He also worked as a film stuntman and occasional actor, prominently with a small role as a bartender in Cobb, the 1994 biopic of baseball player Ty Cobb.

On the night of May 1, 2012, Smith left a friend's house in Oak Park, where he had been staying due to reported marital difficulties. When he failed to pick up one of his sons for school the next morning, Smith's family reported him missing. Two years later, with Smith still missing and no evidence of his presence anywhere past the night of his disappearance, he was retroactively declared legally dead. Several months later, on October 26, 2014, hikers chanced upon Smith's remains near Palmdale in the Antelope Valley.

In January 2015, John Lenzie Creech was arrested and charged with Smith's murder. Creech was a convicted drug dealer who had begun an eight-year prison sentence on that charge shortly after Smith disappeared. Smith had reportedly been romantically involved with Creech's wife Chandrika Cade-Creech. Creech's attorney said the death was a "tragic accident". According to testimony before the grand jury that indicted Creech on the murder charge, he allegedly beat Smith to death after catching him and his wife together. Creech was convicted of voluntary manslaughter on July 3, 2017.

== Early life ==
Smith was from the San Fernando Valley. He was a star player on the Van Nuys High School boys' basketball team in the early 1970s. He was named a second-team All-American by Parade magazine as a senior in 1973. Smith went on to attend the University of California at Los Angeles (UCLA) and play there for coach John Wooden. In his sophomore year he was a forward on the 1975 team which won that year's NCAA championship, Wooden's tenth and last.

Smith did not play in UCLA's 92–85 title-game defeat of Kentucky. The next season was his best at UCLA, as he appeared in all but two games, averaging 5.9 points per game (ppg). In the 1976 Final Four, he appeared twice. Against Indiana, the eventual champs, he scored six points, adding eight points and four rebounds in the third-place game victory over Rutgers. After the season, he transferred to University of Hawaii for a season and finished his playing career with the Rainbow Warriors basketball team. Smith set the school's single-season scoring record of 23.4 ppg, a mark that stands despite the subsequent introduction of the three-point field goal.

While at Hawaii, Smith became recognizable for complementing his then long hair with a bandana, and bringing his dog to practice. Former Rainbow Warriors coach Riley Wallace, who coached against Smith at the time, remembered him as a formidable opponent. "He frustrated me as a coach," Wallace recalls. "He could score from anywhere on the floor ... [he was] probably one of the best shooters in the history of Hawaii."

== Career ==
Smith eventually began a career in the film industry, at first in front of the camera. He made his acting debut playing a bodyguard in a televised adaptation of Elmore Leonard's Glitz. The following year, he had a small role in Greg Mottola's debut short, "Swingin' in the Painter's Room."

After playing a bartender in the 1994 film Cobb, a biopic of baseball player Ty Cobb, Smith went into the business side of the industry as an executive. He took a job in 20th Century Fox's distribution department, making sure that films got to the theaters they were scheduled to appear in. While he was not involved with the creative aspect of the business, he has been credited with helping films such as Titanic, Avatar and the rereleases of the original Star Wars trilogy succeed.

By 2012 he was Fox's regional branch manager for theaters in the Dallas and Oklahoma City areas, working out of the company's Calabasas offices. According to friends, he had talked about returning to acting when he retired from Fox as he expected to within a few years.

== Personal life ==
He had settled in the West Hills area of the Valley with his wife, Lisa, and their three sons. One of his sons, Evan, played basketball for University of Southern California, and was later featured on the reality show Temptation Island.

In the meantime, his success was offset by marital, financial and substance abuse difficulties. He spent time in drug rehab. Regarding the Smiths' financial problems, they had bought their house when the market was booming and prices were high. As a result of the Panic of 2008, the market value of his home dropped sharply and he was "upside down" or having negative equity on the mortgage. Smith was thus under significant pressure and attempting to sell the house.

== Disappearance ==
Smith attended CinemaCon, the annual convention of the National Association of Theatre Owners in Las Vegas. Upon his return to the Los Angeles area, he went not to his West Hills home but, due to recent problems in his marriage, that of a female colleague and family friend who lived on Kellwood Court in nearby Oak Park. The Smith family says the overnight stay at Gavin's friend's home was planned. Recent marital problems had led Smith's son, Evan, to criticize his father for "leaving the family" in a since-deleted tweet two weeks earlier. He reportedly stopped speaking to his father as well. Evan later denied his parents were separating, saying "they were just going through normal stuff couples go through."

According to the friend whom Smith was staying with, the two were up watching television until sometime after 9 pm. When the friend went to bed, Smith told her he would be following shortly. Instead, around 10 pm, he apparently got into his black 2000 Mercedes-Benz E420 with California license plate 6EKT044 and left. One report claims someone on the street actually saw the car as it departed. Lisa Smith, who had been busy attending to her ill mother, says she spoke with Gavin during the day to arrange for him to pick up one of their other sons from school the morning of May 2.

His family agreed it was unlike Smith to leave the house in the late evening without plans to do so or at least giving notice that the trip was unplanned. Their family friend reported that when she last saw Smith he was wearing the purple workout pants he had borrowed from Evan with the intent of wearing them off to bed. This choice of clothing, they believe, makes it unlikely Smith's sudden departure was expected or that he was going somewhere he anticipated being seen. Furthermore, since he had left his cellphone charger, a shaving kit and other personal belongings at the Oak Park residence, likelihood loomed large that Smith didn't expect anything beyond an immediate return.

In May 2014, two years after Smith was last seen, law enforcement officials declared Smith dead with a judge issuing a death certificate. His date of death was declared to have been the night he disappeared. "I think the idea of a person who goes missing out of nowhere is intriguing and tragic," said a spokesman for the LACSD.

=== Investigation ===
When Smith didn't show up the next morning at work nor to pick up his son, his family and coworkers reported him missing. Among the personal belongings he did take with him when he left the Oak Park house were his cell phone and credit cards. Neither had been used since his disappearance. They couldn't identify anyone who might have had a reason to harm him but believed that his fate or whereabouts were known. "We know someone knows something. There's no doubt that someone knows something," Smith's wife said. They believed his clothing and general appearance would not go unnoticed or unremembered.

The Los Angeles County Sheriff's Department (LACSD) led the investigation. They had suggested that they had pings from Smith's cell phone after 10 pm the night he disappeared, although they didn't make the specifics public. "He was bouncing around the Valley or at least his phone was," said LACSD Sgt. John O'Brien. "We are talking about after bars close." On May 8, a male body was found in the Angeles National Forest near the Angeles Crest Highway above La Cañada Flintridge but it was not Smith's.

The Smiths and their friends had been looking in ravines in the area or other places where his car might have gone off the road without success. A volunteer search of remote areas planned for the weekend of May 19–20 was called off due to the lack of "a specific area of defined interest" in which to search. Flyers were distributed and the LACSD had a special hotline number which, it said, received "lots of tips". The family had put up a blog dedicated to the search and was offering a $20,000 reward. Evan Smith had been using his Twitter feed to spread the word on the search as well.

A possible sighting of Smith after his disappearance was reported at the end of the month. David Brill of Madison, Wisconsin, who had been traveling to Southern California on business around the time Smith disappeared, told a TV station in his hometown that he had seen Smith with a woman at a restaurant in Morro Bay on May 7. The next morning he read the story online and identified Smith as the man. The waitress who served the man also believed him to be Smith and said he paid in cash and told her that he and his companion would be staying in town for a few days then continuing north up the Pacific coast. The restaurant claimed to have a security camera tape but would not release it to the media.

On June 8, police, accompanied by a SWAT team, executed a search warrant at a Canoga Park home belonging to a couple identified as John and Chandrika Creech in connection with the case. After five hours, they emerged with several boxes and a computer and towed away a black Audi sport-utility vehicle. Although searches like this are unusual in a missing-persons case and homicide detectives were reportedly among the investigators present, the LACSD emphasized that it was still a missing-persons case and no evidence of foul play had yet been discovered. A lawyer for the Creeches who spoke with reporters at the scene said it was the second search of their house in the past month but refused to comment further. Later, it was reported that more than 20 search warrants had been issued so far and police had seized cellphones and other files from the Creech house.

Two weeks later, more details about why the Creeches' house may have been searched were reported. Los Angeles County Sheriff's Lt. Dave Dolson said Smith met Chandrika Creech while they were both in drug rehab and that they were in a romantic relationship. After the affair had begun in 2008, she had broken it off at the request of her husband John Creech, a convicted drug dealer who was facing new charges at the time of the search and had reportedly had no contact with Smith other than an email exchange in 2008.

Smith's family and friends spent the second weekend of July distributing fliers and putting up posters in Sylmar, the city's northernmost neighborhood. According to them, the detectives investigating Smith's disappearance said his last cellphone ping had come from the area. "The police have led us specifically to this area," she said to reporters.

Since the search of the Creeches, the LACSD had not made any more public moves related to the case. John Creech pleaded guilty to the drug charges and was sentenced to eight years in prison in September 2012. America's Most Wanted did a segment on the case in October.

Confronted by his wife, Smith initially broke off the affair with Creech. In 2010 however, Smith and Creech resumed their relationship and had begun exchanging romantic messages. Smith's wife discovered them and in an impulsive decision, drove her two sons to Creech's home where they told John Creech of the affair. He initially indicated his intent to kill their father but later relented, telling the sons, "... you just saved your father's life by coming here today." In 2012, when the romance rekindled yet again, Creech allegedly made good on his threat, stalking Chandrika Creech using a cell phone GPS tracking application to follow her to the point of the rendezvous. Creech then allegedly pummeled Smith to his death, temporarily ditched his car and body at an accomplice's garage near Porter Ranch after the killing and returned later to retrieve the body and tow Smith's car to a secluded, clandestine location.

In August, Fox cleaned out Smith's office and sent anything the police did not need for their investigation to the Smiths' home.

Smith's sister Tara Addeo and John Creech's lawyer, Daniel Teola, told The Hollywood Reporter that the LACSD's search of the Creech residence had not yielded anything of use. She had nevertheless come to believe that he had become the victim of a crime. "I know that Gavin would not hurt himself and I have a hard time believing that Gavin would ever walk away from his sons," she said. "The only other alternative is that there would have been foul play." A month later Lisa Smith told the Reporter that she had reached a similar conclusion. "I just don't picture him walking in and saying, 'I'm sorry; I just needed a breather.' I'm prepared for the worst."

On January 23, 2013, a vehicle seized at an unrelated Granada Hills drug bust turned out to belong to Creech. It led investigators to Smith's missing Mercedes, found a month later at a Simi Valley storage facility, also connected with Creech, whom police continued to describe as a person of interest. Blood and body tissue, including skin stuck to the car seat, was found inside, later identified as belonging to Smith.

In March 2013, a sheriff's statement said detectives were now investigating the case as a homicide, although Smith's body had not been found. Officials also revealed that they believed they had identified the motive in the alleged crime. However, citing the ongoing investigation, they declined to elaborate on the possible motive or any other details of the case.

==== Discovery of remains ====
On October 26, 2014, Smith's remains were found in Palmdale, California. A hiker's dog found a shallow grave containing a skull, some bones and clothing in a rural area between Palmdale and Acton just outside the Angeles National Forest. Authorities announced the body's discovery 11 days later, after it had been positively identified as Smith.

The cause of his death was not initially known as the county coroner's office was working to establish it. Investigators said it might take some time to do so if indeed they could. "It could be months, if ever, worst-case scenario," said a spokesman for the coroner. Nevertheless, the Los Angeles Times quoted anonymous sources as saying that investigators believe that Smith was killed at the direction of one person by others with experience in violent crime.

At a press conference held the day the body's discovery was announced, investigators shared more information. Their theory was that Smith was killed in his car shortly after he disappeared. Based on that evidence, they had "confidently labeled Smith's death a homicide" after finding the car in 2013. They believed the death would prove to be the result of blunt force trauma and although they could not yet rule out gunshot wounds, they didn't believe there would be any.

==== Arrest ====
In January 2015, three months after Smith's remains were discovered, Creech, two years into an eight-year sentence, was arrested and charged with his murder. The arraignment was postponed for a month. Creech's attorney called Smith's death a "tragic accident", saying his client was innocent of the murder charge. "There may have been a fight but I can tell you there was no criminal intent," said Alex Kessel.

In May of that year, the prosecution released transcripts of testimony before the grand jury that indicted Creech on murder charges. According to witnesses, on the night of May 1 he borrowed a van and went to where Smith had parked his Mercedes with Chandrika Creech. Surprising them there, he beat Smith severely while Chandrika, who believed she would be next, escaped and screamed for help. Later Creech, who did not initially believe Smith had been fatally injured, drove Smith's car to Stan McQuay's home in Porter Ranch. He and McQuay then extracted Smith's body and disposed of it, wrapped in a bloodied sheet and buried it in a shallow grave east of Acton in the Antelope Valley off Angeles Forest Highway. McQuay temporarily stored Smith's missing vehicle in his garage one week from the night of Smith's murder, affording Creech sufficient time to make clandestine arrangements for its long-term concealment and was then parked in a car-sized room at a public storage facility just west of McQuay's Porter Ranch residence in Simi Valley.

== Trial and conviction ==
John Creech was accused by prosecutors of first-degree murder. They said he tracked his wife Chandrika and Smith with hidden GPS and made good on his earlier threat to kill Smith if the affair continued.

Creech testified in his own defense, saying he had been attacked by Smith and fought to save himself. He admitted that he should have called 911 to administer to Smith afterward.

Faced with a choice of first-degree murder, second-degree murder or voluntary manslaughter, the jury took only one hour to acquit Creech on the first two charges and to convict him on voluntary manslaughter.

Two months after the July 2017 verdict, the judge sentenced Creech to the maximum sentence allowed by law: 11 years incarcerated.

All the others involved in helping Creech dispose of the evidence were given plea deals by the prosecution in exchange for their testimony against Creech but none served jail time.

== See also ==
- Lists of solved missing person cases
