= 1993–94 Hawaii Rainbow Warriors basketball team =

American college basketball season

1993–94 Hawaii Rainbow Warriors basketball

WAC Tournament champion

NCAA, First round
- Conference: Western Athletic Conference
- Record: 18–15 (11–7 WAC)
- Head coach: Riley Wallace (7th season)
- Associate head coach: Bob Nash (7th season)
- Assistant coach: Jackson Wheeler (4th season)
- Home arena: Stan Sheriff Center

1993–94 WAC men's basketball standings
	Conf.				Overall
Team	W		L	PCT	W		L	PCT
New Mexico	14	–	4	.778	23	–	8	.742
Fresno State	13	–	5	.722	21	–	11	.656
BYU	12	–	6	.667	22	–	10	.688
Hawaii †	11	–	7	.611	18	–	15	.545
Colorado State	8	–	10	.444	15	–	13	.536
Utah	8	–	10	.444	14	–	14	.500
UTEP	8	–	10	.444	18	–	12	.600
Wyoming	7	–	11	.389	14	–	14	.500
San Diego State	6	–	12	.333	12	–	16	.429
Air Force	3	–	15	.167	8	–	18	.308
† 1994 WAC tournament winner Rankings from AP Poll

The 1993–94 Hawaii Rainbow Warriors basketball team represented the University of Hawaiʻi at Mānoa in the 1993–94 NCAA Division I men's basketball season. The Rainbow Warriors, led by head coach Riley Wallace, played their home games at the Stan Sheriff Center in Honolulu, Hawaii, as members of the Western Athletic Conference. The Rainbow Warriors finished fourth in the WAC during the regular season, but landed three upset victories in three days during the WAC tournament, finishing with a 73–66 victory over BYU in the championship game.

As WAC tournament champions, Hawaii earned an automatic bid to the NCAA tournament, and were given the No. 13 seed in the West region. The Rainbow Warriors were eliminated in the first round of the tournament, losing to Syracuse, 92–78.

== Roster ==
1993–94 Hawaii Rainbow Warriors men's basketball team
Players	Coaches
Pos. / # / Name / Height / Weight / Year / Hometown; G / 13 / Trevor Ruffin / 6 ft 1 in (1.85 m) / 185 lb (84 kg) / Sr / Buffalo, New York	Head coach: Riley Wallace (Centenary); Assistant coach(es): Bob Nash (Hawaiʻi); Jackson Wheeler (Marymount (KS)); Legend: (C) Team captain; (S) Suspended; (I) Ineligible; (W) Walk-on; Injured; Current redshirt; Roster

== Schedule and results ==
Date time, TV	Rank^{#}	Opponent^{#}	Result	Record	Site city, state
Regular season
Nov 25, 1993*		vs. Portland; Great Alaska Shootout	L 47–100	0–1	Sullivan Arena; Anchorage, Alaska
Nov 26, 1993*		vs. Wake Forest; Great Alaska Shootout	L 49–78	0–2	Sullivan Arena; Anchorage, Alaska
Nov 27, 1993*		vs. NC State; Great Alaska Shootout	L 48–83	0–3	Sullivan Arena; Anchorage, Alaska
Dec 1, 1993*		at No. 4 North Carolina	L 77–92	0–4	Dean Smith Center; Chapel Hill, North Carolina
Dec 10, 1993*		UMKC	W 72–54	1–4	Neal S. Blaisdell Center; Honolulu, Hawaii
Dec 11, 1993*		UAB	L 59–79	1–5	Neal S. Blaisdell Center; Honolulu, Hawaii
Dec 17, 1993*		Mercer	W 92–67	2–5	Neal S. Blaisdell Center; Honolulu, Hawaii
Dec 18, 1993*		Kansas State	L 61–65	2–6	Neal S. Blaisdell Center; Honolulu, Hawaii
Dec 27, 1993*		Army; Rainbow Classic	W 85–69	3–6	Neal S. Blaisdell Center; Honolulu, Hawaii
Dec 28, 1993*		Evansville; Rainbow Classic	W 67–62	4–6	Neal S. Blaisdell Center; Honolulu, Hawaii
Dec 29, 1993*		No. 11 Louisville; Rainbow Classic	L 79–85	4–7	Neal S. Blaisdell Center; Honolulu, Hawaii
Jan 3, 1994		at San Diego State	W 78–73	5–7 (1–0)	Peterson Gym; San Diego, California
Mar 5, 1994		San Diego State	L 74–84	15–14 (11–7)	Neal S. Blaisdell Center; Honolulu, Hawaii
WAC tournament
Mar 10, 1994*	(4)	vs. (5) Colorado State; Quarterfinals	W 65–61	16–14	Delta Center; Salt Lake City, Utah
Mar 11, 1994*	(4)	vs. (1) New Mexico; Semifinals	W 61–58	17–14	Delta Center; Salt Lake City, Utah
Mar 12, 1994*	(4)	vs. (3) BYU; Championship	W 73–66	18–14	Delta Center; Salt Lake City, Utah
NCAA tournament
Mar 17, 1994*	(13 MW)	vs. (4 MW) No. 15 Syracuse; First round	L 78–92	18–15	Dee Events Center; Ogden, Utah
*Non-conference game. ^{#}Rankings from AP Poll. (#) Tournament seedings in parentheses. W=West. All times are in Hawaiian Time.
