= 1994 WAC men's basketball tournament =

- Classification: Division I
- Season: 1993–94
- Teams: 10
- Site: Delta Center; Salt Lake City, UT
- Champions: Hawaii (1st title)
- Winning coach: Riley Wallace (1st title)
- MVP: Trevor Ruffin (Hawaii)

1993–94 WAC men's basketball standings
| | Conf. | | | | Overall |
| Team | W | | L | PCT | W | | L | PCT |
|---|---|---|---|---|---|---|---|---|
| New Mexico | 14 | – | 4 | .778 | 23 | – | 8 | .742 |
| Fresno State | 13 | – | 5 | .722 | 21 | – | 11 | .656 |
| BYU | 12 | – | 6 | .667 | 22 | – | 10 | .688 |
| Hawaii † | 11 | – | 7 | .611 | 18 | – | 15 | .545 |
| Colorado State | 8 | – | 10 | .444 | 15 | – | 13 | .536 |
| Utah | 8 | – | 10 | .444 | 14 | – | 14 | .500 |
| UTEP | 8 | – | 10 | .444 | 18 | – | 12 | .600 |
| Wyoming | 7 | – | 11 | .389 | 14 | – | 14 | .500 |
| San Diego State | 6 | – | 12 | .333 | 12 | – | 16 | .429 |
| Air Force | 3 | – | 15 | .167 | 8 | – | 18 | .308 |
† 1994 WAC tournament winner Rankings from AP Poll

The 1994 Western Athletic Conference men's basketball tournament was held March 9–12 at the Delta Center in Salt Lake City, Utah.

Hawaii defeated BYU in the championship game, 73–66, to clinch their first WAC men's tournament championship.

The Rainbow Warriors, in turn, received an automatic bid to the 1994 NCAA tournament. They were joined in the tournament by the conference's regular season champions, New Mexico, who received an at-large bid to the tournament.

== Format ==
No changes were made to the tournament format from the previous year. The top six teams received byes into the quarterfinal round, leaving the lowest four-seeded teams to play in the first round. Teams were seeded based on regular season conference records.

== Bracket ==
First round Wednesday, March 9
9 | San Diego State | 54
8 | Wyoming | 51
7 | UTEP | 72
10 | Air Force | 58

Quarterfinals; Thursday, March 10
1 | New Mexico | 61
9 | San Diego State | 46
5 | Colorado State | 61
4 | Hawaii | 65
3 | BYU | 96
6 | Utah | 65
7 | UTEP | 66
2 | Fresno State | 88

Semifinals; Friday, March 11
1 | New Mexico | 58
4 | Hawaii | 61
3 | BYU | 87
2 | Fresno State | 72

Championship; Saturday, March 12
4 | Hawaii | 73
3 | BYU | 66
