= 1993–94 New Mexico Lobos men's basketball team =

American college basketball season

1993–94 New Mexico Lobos men's basketball

WAC regular season champions

NCAA tournament
- Conference: Western Athletic Conference
- Record: 23–8 (14–4 WAC)
- Head coach: Dave Bliss (6th season)
- Home arena: University Arena

1993–94 WAC men's basketball standings
	Conf.				Overall
Team	W		L	PCT	W		L	PCT
New Mexico	14	–	4	.778	23	–	8	.742
Fresno State	13	–	5	.722	21	–	11	.656
BYU	12	–	6	.667	22	–	10	.688
Hawaii †	11	–	7	.611	18	–	15	.545
Colorado State	8	–	10	.444	15	–	13	.536
Utah	8	–	10	.444	14	–	14	.500
UTEP	8	–	10	.444	18	–	12	.600
Wyoming	7	–	11	.389	14	–	14	.500
San Diego State	6	–	12	.333	12	–	16	.429
Air Force	3	–	15	.167	8	–	18	.308
† 1994 WAC tournament winner Rankings from AP Poll

The 1993–94 New Mexico Lobos men's basketball team represented the University of New Mexico as a member of the Western Athletic Conference. The Lobos were coached by head coach Dave Bliss and played their home games at the University Arena, also known as "The Pit", in Albuquerque, New Mexico.

== Roster ==
1993–94 New Mexico Lobos men's basketball team
Players
Coaches

Pos.	#	Name	Height	Weight	Year	Hometown
G	5	Charles Smith	6 ft 5 in (1.96 m)	190 lb (86 kg)	Fr	Fort Worth, Texas
G	12	Greg Brown	5 ft 7 in (1.7 m)	140 lb (64 kg)	Sr	Albuquerque, New Mexico

Head coach

- Dave Bliss

Assistant coach(es)

Legend

- (C) Team captain
- (S) Suspended
- (I) Ineligible
- (W) Walk-on
- Injured
- Current redshirt

== Schedule and results ==
Date time, TV	Rank^{#}	Opponent^{#}	Result	Record	Site (attendance) city, state
Regular season
Dec 8, 1993*		at Texas Tech	W 82–76	5–0	Lubbock Municipal Coliseum; Lubbock, Texas
Dec 11, 1993*		New Mexico State	L 104–112 ^{2OT}	5–1	University Arena; Albuquerque, New Mexico
Mar 5, 1994		at Utah	L 72–79	22–6 (14–4)	Jon M. Huntsman Center; Salt Lake City, Utah
WAC tournament
Mar 10, 1994*	(1)	vs. (9) San Diego State; Quarterfinals	W 61–46	23–6	Delta Center; Salt Lake City, Utah
Mar 11, 1994*	(1)	vs. (4) Hawaii; Semifinals	L 58–61	23–7	Delta Center; Salt Lake City, Utah
NCAA tournament
Mar 18, 1994*	(10 W)	vs. (7 W) Virginia; First round	L 54–57	23–8	ARCO Arena; Sacramento, California
*Non-conference game. ^{#}Rankings from AP poll. (#) Tournament seedings in parentheses. W=West.
