= 2000 WAC men's basketball tournament =

- Classification: Division I
- Season: 1999–00
- Teams: 8
- Site: Selland Arena; Fresno, CA
- Champions: Fresno State (vacated) (1st title)
- Winning coach: Jerry Tarkanian (vacated) (1st title)
- MVP: Courtney Alexander (Fresno State)

1999–2000 WAC men's basketball standings
	Conf.				Overall
Team	W		L	PCT	W		L	PCT
No. 18 Tulsa	12	–	2	.857	32	–	5	.865
Fresno State †	11	–	3	.786	24	–	10	.706
SMU	9	–	5	.643	21	–	9	.700
TCU	8	–	6	.571	18	–	14	.563
San Jose State	6	–	8	.429	15	–	15	.500
Hawaii	5	–	9	.357	17	–	12	.586
UTEP	4	–	10	.286	13	–	15	.464
Rice	1	–	13	.071	5	–	22	.185
† 2000 WAC tournament winner Rankings from AP Poll

The 2000 Western Athletic Conference men's basketball tournament was held March 9–11 at the Selland Arena at Fresno State University in Fresno, California.

Hosts Fresno State upset top-seeded Tulsa in the championship game, 75–72, to clinch their first WAC men's tournament championship. However, most of the Bulldogs' season was later vacated by the NCAA for using an ineligible player.

Fresno State received the WAC's automatic bid to the 2000 NCAA tournament. They were joined in the tournament by WAC regular season champion Tulsa, who earned an at-large bid.

== Format ==
Prior to the 1999–2000 season, eight of the WAC's members announced they were departing to form the new Mountain West Conference: Air Force, BYU, Colorado State, UNLV, New Mexico, San Diego State, Utah, and Wyoming. With this dramatic departure, the league was left with only eight teams. The tournament field was subsequently reduced from twelve to eight, and the division structure was eliminated.

All teams now qualified for the tournament and were all placed into the initial quarterfinal round. The teams were seeded based on regular season conference record.

== Bracket ==
Quarterfinals; Thursday, March 9
1	#14 Tulsa	71
8	Rice	51
5	San Jose State	71
4	TCU	84
3	SMU	82
6	Hawaii	87
7	UTEP	70
2	Fresno State	79

Semifinals; Friday, March 10
1	#14 Tulsa	93
4	TCU	77
6	Hawaii	100
2	Fresno State	103

Championship; Saturday, March 11
1	#14 Tulsa	72
2	Fresno State	75

== See also ==
- WAC men's basketball tournament
