= Luke Epplin =

American sportswriter

- Born: Rockford, Illinois, U.S.
- Education: Washington University in St. Louis (B.A.)
- Occupation: Sportswriter
- Spouse: Jane Healy (m. 2023)
- Children: 1

Luke Epplin is an American sportswriter whose articles have appeared in publications such as The Atlantic, The New Yorker, Salon and The Daily Beast. He is the author of two sports history books.

== Personal life ==
Born in Rockford, Illinois, Epplin grew up in rural Litchfield where he attended Litchfield High School. Later on, he attended college in St. Louis, graduating from Washington University in St. Louis.

He is a fan of the St. Louis Cardinals and grew up listening to team broadcasters Jack Buck and Mike Shannon on the radio.

Epplin married his wife Jane Healy in May 2023; their daughter Ava Healy Epplin was born in March 2024. The couple currently reside in Astoria, Queens in New York City.

== Career ==
Epplin is a freelance sportswriter who has written for a number of publications on popular culture and sports.

He is best known for his book Our Team: The Epic Story of Four Men and the World Series That Changed Baseball which focuses on the 1948 Cleveland Indians. In particular, it focuses at Indians players Larry Doby, the first African-American player in the American League and second ever after Jackie Robinson, Bob Feller, the team's star pitcher, Satchel Paige, considered to be one of the greatest Negro league pitchers in history, and team owner Bill Veeck, one of the most eccentric figures in baseball history.

In 2022, Our Team was nominated for the Casey Award, given out to the best baseball book of the year.

His second book, Moses And The Doctor, was released in February 2026. It focuses on basketball players Julius Erving and Moses Malone and the 1983 Philadelphia 76ers.
