= Stan McQuay =

American professional bodybuilder & businessman (born 1973)

- Professional bodybuilder

Personal info
- Born: July 12, 1973 (age 53); Yokosuka, Japan

Best statistics
- Height: 5 ft 7 in (1.70 m)
- Weight: (In Season): 198-202lb(84/86kg) (Off-Season):205-215lb (93/95kg).

Professional (Pro) career
- Best win: NPC Nationals Lightheavyweight National Champion
- Active: Since 1997

Stan McQuay (born July 12, 1973 in Yokosuka, Japan) is a professional bodybuilder and businessman, known for his appearances in muscle championships and as the founder of Physique Inc., a bodybuilding coaching company, as well as his involvement in the murder of Gavin Smith.

== Early life ==
Born in Yokosuka, Japan in 1977 to a Japanese mother and Irish father, Stan McQuay moved to the United States with his family at an early age, living first in Illinois before settling in Van Nuys, California. Growing up in the San Fernando Valley, Stan spent most of his time in the weight room, a means to an end for competing in American football and Brazilian jiu-jitsu.

McQuay built up a criminal record in his late teenage years, and he was sentenced to 12 months of community service for his involvement in a murder, for which his arrest was in front of his peers at school. His accomplice was sentenced to jail time for the murder. He cites this moment as what influenced him to be more careful with the law, although later he was found to be involved in aiding and abetting convicted felon John Creech in hiding a vehicle containing a body in his garage for a week.

== Career ==
McQuay founded Physique, Inc., in 2006 after winning the NPC Nationals bodybuilding competition, advertising his business as "the go-to platform for the person seeking expert guidance and accountability" with "the best trainers industry". McQuay additionally claims to have appeared on Discovery Channel, Fox, and ESPN, and have trained numerous personalities in the entertainment industry, including Dr. Dre, Xzibit, and Vin Diesel, as well as various unnamed National Football League and Major League Baseball players.

== Murder of Gavin Smith ==
Subpoenaed for testimony before a Los Angeles County grand jury, Stan McQuay was called to testify under oath regarding his involvement in the assault and murder of Fox Film executive Gavin Smith, having aided and abetted in the impromptu storage and concealment of Smith's stolen vehicle, for one week from the night of the murder, in his own garage, affording his gym buddy John Creech, a convicted drug dealer having just murdered Smith in the front seat of Smith's Mercedes-Benz E420, time sufficient to remove and discard Smith's body, and arrange for the bloodied vehicle's clandestine storage at a long-term storage facility in Simi Valley.

== Personal life ==
McQuay has 3 children. McQuay's eldest daughter, Tati, is an actress, dancer, and social media influencer.

== See also ==
- List of male professional bodybuilders
- List of female professional bodybuilders
