= 2001–02 Tulsa Golden Hurricane men's basketball team =

American college basketball season

2001–02 Tulsa Golden Hurricane men's basketball

WAC Regular Season co-champion

NCAA tournament, second round
- Conference: Western Athletic Conference
- Record: 27–7 (15–3 WAC)
- Head coach: John Phillips (1st season)
- Home arena: Reynolds Center

2001–02 WAC men's basketball standings
	Conf.				Overall
Team	W		L	PCT	W		L	PCT
No. 25 Hawaii †	15	–	3	.833	27	–	6	.818
Tulsa	15	–	3	.833	27	–	7	.794
Louisiana Tech	14	–	4	.778	22	–	10	.688
SMU	10	–	8	.556	15	–	14	.517
Nevada	9	–	9	.500	17	–	13	.567
Fresno State	9	–	9	.500	19	–	15	.559
Boise State	6	–	12	.333	13	–	17	.433
Rice	5	–	13	.278	10	–	19	.345
San Jose State	4	–	14	.222	10	–	22	.313
UTEP	3	–	15	.167	10	–	22	.313
† 2002 WAC tournament winner Rankings from AP Poll

The 2001–02 Tulsa Golden Hurricane men's basketball team represented the University of Tulsa as a member of the Western Athletic Conference in the 2001–02 college basketball season. The Golden Hurricane played their home games at the Reynolds Center. Led by head coach John Phillips, they finished the season 27–7 overall and 15–3 in conference play to finish in a tie atop the WAC standings. The lost in the championship game of the 2002 WAC men's basketball tournament to earn an at-large bid to the NCAA tournament as No. 12 seed in the Midwest region. The Golden Hurricane upset No. 5 seed Marquette in the first round, before falling to Kentucky in the Round of 32.

== Roster ==
2001–02 Tulsa Golden Hurricane men's basketball team
Players
Coaches

Pos.	#	Name	Height	Weight	Year	Hometown
F	02	Charlie Davis	6 ft 7 in (2.01 m)	—	Jr
G	12	Dante Swanson	5 ft 10 in (1.78 m)	—	Jr
G	14	Antonio Reed	5 ft 10 in (1.78 m)	—	Jr
F	22	DeMario Hooper	6 ft 4 in (1.93 m)	—	Jr
F	34	Kevin Johnson	6 ft 7 in (2.01 m)	—	Jr

Head coach

John Phillips

Assistant coach(es)

Legend

- (C) Team captain
- (S) Suspended
- (I) Ineligible
- (W) Walk-on
- Injured
- Current redshirt

== Schedule and results ==
Date time, TV	Rank^{#}	Opponent^{#}	Result	Record	Site (attendance) city, state
Exhibition
Nov 4, 2001*; 2:05 p.m.		Athletes First	W 101–77		Donald W. Reynolds Center; Tulsa, Oklahoma
Nov 10, 2001*; 7:05 p.m.		World Wide Foreign	W 97–91		Donald W. Reynolds Center; Tulsa, Oklahoma
Regular Season
Nov 19, 2001*; 7:05 p.m.		Grambling State	W 104–61	1–0	Donald W. Reynolds Center (7,523); Tulsa, Oklahoma
Nov 24, 2001*; 7:05 p.m.		Morris Brown	W 88–41	2–0	Donald W. Reynolds Center (7,740); Tulsa, Oklahoma
Nov 28, 2001*; 7:05 p.m.		Arkansas	L 75–79	2–1	Donald W. Reynolds Center (8,355); Tulsa, Oklahoma
Dec 1, 2001*; 2:05 p.m.		Oral Roberts	W 73–66	3–1	Donald W. Reynolds Center; Tulsa, Oklahoma
Dec 4, 2001*; 7:05 p.m.		Southwest Missouri State	W 90–73	4–1	Donald W. Reynolds Center; Tulsa, Oklahoma
Dec 8, 2001*; 7:05 p.m.		at Wichita State	W 82–76	5–1	Charles Koch Arena; Wichita, Kansas
Dec 14, 2001*; 7:00 p.m.		at Texas A&M	W 90–56	6–1	Compaq Center; Houston, Texas
Dec 20, 2001*; 5:00 p.m.		vs. Buffalo; Yahoo! Sports Invitational	W 80–75	7–1	George Q. Cannon Activities Center; Kahuku, Hawaii
Dec 21, 2001*; 10:00 p.m.		vs. Montana; Yahoo! Sports Invitational	W 92–82	8–1	George Q. Cannon Activities Center; Kahuku, Hawaii
Dec 22, 2001*; 9:00 p.m.		vs. BYU–Hawaii; Yahoo! Sports Invitational	W 88–67	9–1	George Q. Cannon Activities Center; Kahuku, Hawaii
Dec 29, 2001*; 8:00 p.m.		vs. No. 2 Kansas; Morse Chevrolet Shootout	L 85–93	9–2	Kemper Arena (16,013); Kansas City, Missouri
Jan 3, 2002; 9:05 p.m.		at Nevada	W 76–66	10–2 (1–0)	Lawlor Events Center; Reno, Nevada
Jan 5, 2002; 10:59 p.m.		at Fresno State	L 85–86	10–3 (1–1)	Selland Arena; Fresno, California
Jan 10, 2002; 7:05 p.m.		UTEP	W 66–61	11–3 (2–1)	Donald W. Reynolds Center; Tulsa, Oklahoma
Jan 12, 2002; 7:05 p.m.		Boise State	W 80–60	12–3 (3–1)	Donald W. Reynolds Center; Tulsa, Oklahoma
Jan 17, 2002; 7:00 p.m.		at Louisiana Tech	W 71–68	13–3 (4–1)	Thomas Assembly Center; Ruston, Louisiana
Jan 19, 2002; 7:35 p.m.		SMU	W 95–87	14–3 (5–1)	Moody Coliseum; Dallas, Texas
Jan 24, 2002; 7:05 p.m.		San Jose State	W 78–54	15–3 (6–1)	Donald W. Reynolds Center; Tulsa, Oklahoma
Jan 26, 2002; 7:05 p.m.		Hawaii	L 82–90	15–4 (6–2)	Donald W. Reynolds Center (8,355); Tulsa, Oklahoma
Jan 28, 2002; 7:00 p.m.		Rice	W 79–60	16–4 (7–2)	Donald W. Reynolds Center; Tulsa, Oklahoma
Jan 31, 2002; 7:05 p.m.		Fresno State	W 78–63	17–4 (8–2)	Donald W. Reynolds Center; Tulsa, Oklahoma
Feb 2, 2002; 7:05 p.m.		Nevada	W 73–68	18–4 (9–2)	Donald W. Reynolds Center; Tulsa, Oklahoma
Feb 7, 2002; 8:30 p.m.		at Boise State	W 70–56	19–4 (10–2)	BSU Pavilion; Boise, Idaho
Feb 9, 2002; 8:05 p.m.		at UTEP	W 88–76	20–4 (11–2)	Don Haskins Center; El Paso, Texas
Feb 14, 2002; 7:05 p.m.		SMU	W 87–69	21–4 (12–2)	Donald W. Reynolds Center; Tulsa, Oklahoma
Feb 16, 2002; 7:05 p.m.		Louisiana Tech	W 72–63	22–4 (13–2)	Donald W. Reynolds Center; Tulsa, Oklahoma
Feb 21, 2002; 11:05 p.m.		at Hawaii	L 85–86	22–5 (13–3)	Stan Sheriff Center (10,300); Honolulu, Hawaii
Feb 23, 2002; 9:30 p.m.		at San Jose State	W 82–72	23–5 (14–3)	Event Center Arena; San Jose, California
Feb 28, 2002; 7:05 p.m.		at Rice	W 67–62	24–5 (15–3)	Rice Gymnasium; Houston, Texas
WAC Tournament
Mar 7, 2002*; 8:30 p.m.	(2)	(7) Boise State; Quarterfinals	W 72–53	25–5	Donald W. Reynolds Center (7,760); Tulsa, Oklahoma
Mar 8, 2002*; 8:30 p.m.	(2)	(6) Fresno State; Semifinals	W 81–65	26–5	Donald W. Reynolds Center (8,355); Tulsa, Oklahoma
Mar 9, 2002*; 8:00 p.m.	(2)	(1) Hawaii; Championship game	L 59–73	26–6	Donald W. Reynolds Center (8,355); Tulsa, Oklahoma
NCAA Tournament
Mar 14, 2002*; 2:00 p.m.	(12 E)	vs. (5 E) No. 12 Marquette; First Round	W 71–69	27–6	Edward Jones Dome (25,251); St. Louis, Missouri
Mar 16, 2002*; 4:38 p.m.	(12 E)	vs. (4 E) No. 16 Kentucky; Second Round	L 82–87	27–7	Edward Jones Dome (31,484); St. Louis, Missouri
*Non-conference game. ^{#}Rankings from AP Poll. (#) Tournament seedings in parentheses. E=East. All times are in Central.
