= Litchfield High School (Litchfield, Illinois) =

Location
- 1705 N. State St. Litchfield, Illinois 62056; United States; 39°11′19.61″N 89°39′21.35″W

Information
- School type: Public secondary
- School district: Litchfield CUSD #12
- Superintendent: Debbie Poffinbarger
- Principal: Juletta Ellis
- Teaching staff: 29.75 (FTE)
- Grades: 9–12
- Gender: Coed
- Enrollment: 393 (2023–2024)
- Student to teacher ratio: 13.21
- Campus: Small city in rural area
- Colour
- Fight song: Litchfield Fight Song
- Athletics conference: South Central
- Mascot: Purple Panther
- Nickname: Purple Panthers (boys); Lady Panthers (girls)
- Website: Official website

Litchfield High School is a coed public high school located in Litchfield, Illinois in Montgomery County, Illinois, in the United States. LHS is a part of Litchfield Community Unit School District #12.

== Student organizations & activities ==
=== Local Organizations ===
- Band
- Book club
- Chamber Choir
- Dance team
- Drama club
- Eco team
- Homecoming
- Jazz band
- Pep club
- Prom committees
- Rembrandt Society (Illinois Student Art Association)
- Speech team
- Student Council
- Yearbook

=== National Organizations ===
- Family, Career and Community Leaders of America
- Fellowship of Christian Athletes
- Future Farmers of America
- Interact Club
- Key Club
- National Honor Society
- SADD

== Interscholastic athletics & activities ==
Litchfield High School sponsors teams known as the Purple Panthers for boys and Lady Panthers for girls that compete as members of the Illinois High School Association and the South Central Conference. The team colors are purple and white, and the school mascot is a purple panther.

=== Boys' sports ===
- Baseball (JV & Varsity)
- Basketball (Freshman, JV & Varsity)
- Cross country
- Football (Frosh-Soph & Varsity)
- Golf
- Soccer
- Track & Field
- Wrestling (JV & Varsity)

=== Girls' sports ===
- Basketball (JV & Varsity)
- Cheerleading (JV & Varsity)
- Cross country
- Golf
- Soccer (JV & Varsity)
- Softball (JV & Varsity)
- Track & Field
- Volleyball (JV & Varsity)

=== Other activities ===
- Music
  - Band
  - Chorus
- Scholastic Bowl
- Pop Culture Club

== Notable alumni ==
- Ray Schalk, Baseball Hall of Fame catcher; did not graduate.
- Luke Epplin, sportswriter and author.
