= Ah Chew Goo =

American basketball player and coach (1918–2015)

Ah Chew Goo (April 10, 1918 – January 9, 2015) was an American basketball player and coach of the University of Hawaii men's basketball team, who was known primarily for his basketball dribbling and passing abilities.

Goo, who stood at only 5 feet 4.5 inches (1.638 m), was known for his remarkable ability to dribble the ball and keep it away from defenders and for his no-look and seemingly gravity-defying passes.

He started working on his basketball skills at age 7, practising his passing off telephone poles as he walked down the street. As a result, he became one of Hawaii's most famous basketball players, leading Hilo High School to three straight Territorial championships between 1934 and 1936. After high school, Goo played with a traveling team of Hawaiian all-stars in the United States. He retired from competitive basketball in 1940, due to ill health, and never played in college or professionally.

In the mid-1940s, Goo coached a local team in a game against the Harlem Globetrotters. Before the game, he asked Abe Saperstein, coach of the Globetrotters, if he could pull two stunts: one where he would replace a basketball with a deflated ball after a timeout so when a player tried to dribble it, it wouldn't bounce, and the other to tie fishing line around a ball so he could pull it back after faking shooting a free throw. Saperstein said no, but the next year when the Globetrotters returned to Hawaii, they used those both tricks as part of their showtime repertoire. "I originated that, I take credit for that," Goo said.

Press Maravich, father of basketball great Pete Maravich and a future college coach, was stationed in Hawaii during World War II and saw Goo perform his tricks with a basketball. The elder Maravich told Goo that if he ever had a son, he was going to teach him all the tricks he saw Goo perform. His eventual son, "Pistol" Pete Maravich, was renowned for his ball-handling and passing skills and became the highest scoring player in college basketball history. Maravich called Goo "the best ball-handler I've ever seen."

Goo coached the University of Hawaii men's basketball team from 1954 to 1957, compiling a 31–46 (.402 winning percentage) record over three seasons.

He later served at boxing matches, where he was the official knockdown timer.

The University of Hawaii women's basketball team designates a player each season as the recipient of the Ah Chew Goo Achievement Award, the program's most prestigious individual award, which is given to the player who attains basketball excellence through dedication, determination and perseverance. The Hawaii men's team awards the Ah Chew Good Most Inspirational Player Award each season.

Goo was a member of the Hawaii Sports Hall of Fame. He was married to Clara Kim Goo. He died at the age of 96 in 2015.
