= 1999–2000 Tulsa Golden Hurricane men's basketball team =

American college basketball season

1999–2000 Tulsa Golden Hurricane men's basketball

WAC Regular Season Champions

NCAA tournament, Elite Eight
- Conference: Western Athletic Conference

Ranking
- Coaches: No. 9
- AP: No. 18
- Record: 32–5 (12–2 WAC)
- Head coach: Bill Self (3rd season)
- Assistant coaches: Norm Roberts (3rd season); Billy Gillispie (3rd season); John Phillips (3rd season)
- Home arena: Reynolds Center

1999–2000 WAC men's basketball standings
	Conf.				Overall
Team	W		L	PCT	W		L	PCT
No. 18 Tulsa	12	–	2	.857	32	–	5	.865
Fresno State †	11	–	3	.786	24	–	10	.706
SMU	9	–	5	.643	21	–	9	.700
TCU	8	–	6	.571	18	–	14	.563
San Jose State	6	–	8	.429	15	–	15	.500
Hawaii	5	–	9	.357	17	–	12	.586
UTEP	4	–	10	.286	13	–	15	.464
Rice	1	–	13	.071	5	–	22	.185
† 2000 WAC tournament winner Rankings from AP Poll

The 1999–2000 Tulsa Golden Hurricane men's basketball team represented the University of Tulsa as a member of the Western Athletic Conference in the 1999–2000 college basketball season. The Golden Hurricane played their home games at the Reynolds Center. Led by head coach Bill Self, they finished the season 32–5 overall and 12–2 in conference play to finish atop the WAC standings. After losing in the championship game of the 2000 WAC men's basketball tournament, the team defeated UNLV, #7 Cincinnati, and #23 Miami (FL) to reach the Elite Eight of the NCAA tournament, before falling to North Carolina in the South Regional Final. It was the third and final season under Self as coach, as he left for Illinois after the season concluded.

== Roster ==
1999–2000 Tulsa Golden Hurricane men's basketball team
Players
Coaches

Pos.	#	Name	Height	Weight	Year	Hometown
F	02	Charlie Davis	6 ft 7 in (2.01 m)	—	Fr
G	10	Greg Harrington	6 ft 2 in (1.88 m)	—	So
F	11	Eric Coley	6 ft 5 in (1.96 m)	—	Sr
G	12	Dante Swanson	5 ft 10 in (1.78 m)	—	Fr
C	13	Brandon Kurtz	6 ft 10 in (2.08 m)	—	Sr
G	14	Antonio Reed	5 ft 10 in (1.78 m)	—	Fr
F	22	DeMario Hooper	6 ft 4 in (1.93 m)	—	Fr
G	31	Marcus Hill	6 ft 5 in (1.96 m)	—	Jr
G	32	Tony Heard	6 ft 0 in (1.83 m)	—	Sr
F	33	David Shelton	6 ft 6 in (1.98 m)	—	Jr
F	34	Kevin Johnson	6 ft 7 in (2.01 m)	—	Fr
C	55	DeAngelo McDaniel	6 ft 9 in (2.06 m)	—	So

Head coach

Bill Self

Assistant coach(es)

- Norm Roberts
- Billy Gillispie

Legend

- (C) Team captain
- (S) Suspended
- (I) Ineligible
- (W) Walk-on
- Injured
- Current redshirt

== Schedule and results ==
Date time, TV	Rank^{#}	Opponent^{#}	Result	Record	Site (attendance) city, state
Regular Season
Nov 21, 1999*		at Rhode Island	W 91–66	1–0	Keaney Gymnasium (4,317); Kingston, RI
Nov 24, 1999*		Georgia State	W 100–73	2–0	Reynolds Center (8,355); Tulsa, OK
Nov 27, 1999*		Arkansas–Pine Bluff	W 97–45	3–0	Reynolds Center (7,563); Tulsa, OK
Nov 29, 1999*		at Saint Joseph's	W 79–73	4–0	Hagan Arena (2,911); Philadelphia, PA
Dec 1, 1999*		Texas–San Antonio	W 76–59	5–0	Reynolds Center (7,597); Tulsa, OK
Dec 4, 1999*		UAB	W 88–73	6–0	Reynolds Center (7,839); Tulsa, OK
Dec 7, 1999*		Southwest Missouri State	W 69–60	7–0	Reynolds Center (8,355); Tulsa, OK
Dec 11, 1999*		at Oral Roberts	L 59–60	7–1	Mabee Center (8,475); Tulsa, OK
Dec 18, 1999*		Delaware State	W 72–52	8–1	Reynolds Center (7,850); Tulsa, OK
Dec 21, 1999*		vs. Boston College; Puerto Rico Holiday Classic	W 80–66	9–1	Eugene Guerra Sports Complex (435); San Juan, Puerto Rico
Dec 22, 1999*		vs. UNC Charlotte; Puerto Rico Holiday Classic	W 76–61	10–1	Eugene Guerra Sports Complex (100); San Juan, Puerto Rico
Dec 23, 1999*		vs. No. 11 Tennessee; Puerto Rico Holiday Classic	W 88–68	11–1	Eugene Guerra Sports Complex (765); San Juan, Puerto Rico
Dec 28, 1999*	No. 25	UMKC	W 81–60	12–1	Reynolds Center (8,355); Tulsa, OK
Dec 30, 1999*	No. 25	at North Texas	W 113–77	13–1	Super Pit (2,090); Denton, TX
Jan 6, 2000	No. 22	at TCU	W 94–73	14–1 (1–0)	Daniel-Meyer Coliseum (5,260); Fort Worth, TX
Jan 12, 2000*	No. 19	at Creighton	W 75–67	15–1	Omaha Civic Auditorium (5,516); Omaha, NE
Jan 15, 2000*	No. 19	at Rice	W 67–49	16–1 (2–0)	Rice Gymnasium (3,441); Houston, TX
Jan 20, 2000*	No. 15	San Jose State	W 67–41	17–1 (3–0)	Reynolds Center (8,355); Tulsa, OK
Jan 22, 2000*	No. 15	Hawaii	W 100–78	18–1 (4–0)	Reynolds Center (8,355); Tulsa, OK
Jan 24, 2000*	No. 15	Centenary	W 84–44	19–1	Reynolds Center (8,355); Tulsa, OK
Jan 27, 2000*	No. 13	at UTEP	W 89–71	20–1 (5–0)	Don Haskins Center (9,506); El Paso, TX
Jan 29, 2000*	No. 13	at Fresno State	L 73–75	20–2 (5–1)	Selland Arena (10,220); Fresno, CA
Feb 3, 2000*	No. 17	SMU	W 70–59	21–2 (6–1)	Reynolds Center (8,355); Tulsa, OK
Feb 5, 2000*	No. 17	TCU	W 103–70	22–2 (7–1)	Reynolds Center (8,355); Tulsa, OK
Feb 12, 2000*	No. 15	Rice	W 75–33	23–2 (8–1)	Reynolds Center (8,355); Tulsa, OK
Feb 18, 2000*	No. 13	at Hawaii	W 75–61	24–2 (9–1)	Stan Sheriff Center (6,791); Honolulu, Hawaii
Feb 19, 2000*	No. 13	at San Jose State	W 64–56	25–2 (10–1)	The Event Center (1,568); San Jose, CA
Feb 24, 2000	No. 12	Fresno State	L 72–73	25–3 (10–2)	Reynolds Center (8,355); Tulsa, OK
Feb 26, 2000	No. 12	UTEP	W 85–55	26–3 (11–2)	Reynolds Center (8,355); Tulsa, OK
Mar 4, 2000	No. 15	at SMU	W 83–78 ^{2OT}	27–3 (12–2)	Moody Coliseum (8,998); Dallas, TX
WAC Tournament
Mar 9, 2000*	(1) No. 14	vs. (8) Rice; Quarterfinals	W 71–51	28–3	Selland Arena (2,960); Fresno, CA
Mar 10, 2000*	(1) No. 14	vs. (4) TCU; Semifinals	W 93–71	29–3	Selland Arena (9,668); Fresno, CA
Mar 11, 2000*	(1) No. 14	at (2) Fresno State; Championship	L 72–75	29–4	Selland Arena (10,021); Fresno, CA
NCAA Tournament
Mar 17, 2000*	(7 S) No. 18	vs. (10 S) UNLV; First Round	W 89–62	30–4	Bridgestone Arena (17,230); Nashville, TN
Mar 19, 2000*	(7 S) No. 18	vs. (2 S) No. 7 Cincinnati; Second Round	W 69–61	31–4	Bridgestone Arena (17,297); Nashville, TN
Mar 24, 2000*	(7 S) No. 18	vs. (6 S) No. 23 Miami (FL); Sweet Sixteen	W 80–71	32–4	Frank Erwin Center (16,731); Austin, TX
Mar 26, 2000*	(7 S) No. 18	vs. (8 S) North Carolina; Elite Eight	L 55–59	32–5	Frank Erwin Center (16,731); Austin, TX
*Non-conference game. ^{#}Rankings from AP. (#) Tournament seedings in parentheses. S=South. All times are in Central.

== Rankings ==
Ranking movements Legend: ██ Increase in ranking ██ Decrease in ranking — = Not ranked
	Week																			
Poll	Pre	1	2	3	4	5	6	7	8	9	10	11	12	13	14	15	16	17	18	Final
AP	—	—	—	—	—	—	—	25	22	19	15	13	17	15	13	12	15	14	18	Not released
Coaches	—	—	—	—	—	—	—	—	25	22	17	15	16	15	13	13	17	17	19	9

^Coaches did not release a Week 1 poll.
*AP did not release post-NCAA Tournament rankings

== Awards and honors ==
- Bill Self – WAC Coach of the Year
