= 2001 WAC men's basketball tournament =

- Classification: Division I
- Season: 2000–01
- Teams: 9
- Site: Reynolds Center; Tulsa, Oklahoma
- Champions: Hawaii (2nd title)
- MVP: Carl English (Hawaii)

2000–01 WAC men's basketball standings
	Conf.				Overall
Team	W		L	PCT	W		L	PCT
Fresno State	13	–	3	.813	26	–	7	.788
Tulsa	10	–	6	.625	26	–	11	.703
UTEP	10	–	6	.625	23	–	9	.719
TCU	9	–	7	.563	20	–	11	.645
Hawaii †	8	–	8	.500	17	–	14	.548
SMU	8	–	8	.500	18	–	12	.600
San Jose State	6	–	10	.375	14	–	14	.500
Rice	5	–	11	.313	14	–	16	.467
Nevada	3	–	13	.188	10	–	18	.357
† 2001 WAC tournament winner

The 2001 WAC men's basketball tournament was held in the Reynolds Center in Tulsa, Oklahoma. The winners of the tournament were the #5 seeded Hawaii.

== Bracket ==
First round
8	Rice	60
9	Nevada	44

Quarter-finals
1	Fresno State	60
8	Rice	52
5	Hawaii	99
4	TCU	79
3	UTEP	74
6	SMU	70
2	Tulsa	64
7	San Jose State	53

Semi-finals
1	Fresno State	67
5	Hawaii	76
3	UTEP	56
2	Tulsa	59

Final
5	Hawaii	78
2	Tulsa	72*

* - denotes overtime period
