= 2002 WAC men's basketball tournament =

- Classification: Division I
- Season: 2001–02
- Teams: 10
- Site: Reynolds Center; Tulsa, Oklahoma
- Champions: Hawaii Warriors (3rd title)
- MVP: Predrag Savovic (Hawaii)

2001–02 WAC men's basketball standings
	Conf.				Overall
Team	W		L	PCT	W		L	PCT
No. 25 Hawaii †	15	–	3	.833	27	–	6	.818
Tulsa	15	–	3	.833	27	–	7	.794
Louisiana Tech	14	–	4	.778	22	–	10	.688
SMU	10	–	8	.556	15	–	14	.517
Nevada	9	–	9	.500	17	–	13	.567
Fresno State	9	–	9	.500	19	–	15	.559
Boise State	6	–	12	.333	13	–	17	.433
Rice	5	–	13	.278	10	–	19	.345
San Jose State	4	–	14	.222	10	–	22	.313
UTEP	3	–	15	.167	10	–	22	.313
† 2002 WAC tournament winner Rankings from AP Poll

The 2002 WAC men's basketball tournament was held in the Reynolds Center in Tulsa, Oklahoma. The winners of the tournament were the #1 seeded Hawaii Warriors.

== Bracket ==
Play-in Round
9	San Jose State	58
8	Rice	57
7	Boise State	73
10	UTEP	72*

Quarterfinals
1	Hawaii	71
9	San Jose State	56
5	Nevada	72
4	SMU	66
6	Fresno State	72
3	Louisiana Tech	69
2	Tulsa	72
7	Boise State	53

Semifinals
1	Hawaii	90
5	Nevada	68
2	Tulsa	81
6	Fresno State	65

Finals
1	Hawaii	73
2	Tulsa	59

* - denotes overtime period
