= Predrag Savović =

Montenegrin basketball player (born 1976)

- Savović with Denver Nuggets in March 2003.

Personal information
- Born: 21 May 1976 (age 50) Pula, SR Croatia, SFR Yugoslavia
- Listed height: 6 ft 6 in (1.98 m)
- Listed weight: 225 lb (102 kg)

Career information
- College: UAB (1997–1998); Hawaii (1999–2002)
- NBA draft: 2002: undrafted
- Playing career: 1993–2009
- Position: Shooting guard
- Number: 4, 1, 11

Career history
- 1993–1995: Partizan
- 1995–1996: Beovuk 72
- 1996–1997: Zorka Šabac
- 2002–2003: Denver Nuggets
- 2004: Spirou Charleroi
- 2005–2009: Iurbentia Bilbao

Career highlights
- Belgian League champion (2004); AP honorable mention All-American (2002); 2× First-team All-WAC (2001, 2002); WAC tournament MVP (2002)
- Stats at NBA.com
- Stats at Basketball Reference

Predrag Savović (Serbian Cyrillic: Предраг Савовић; born 21 May 1976) is a Montenegrin former professional basketball player. Among many teams in his professional career he played for KK Partizan Belgrade, the National Basketball Association's Denver Nuggets and Iurbentia Bilbao of the Spanish ACB.

== Early life and college career ==
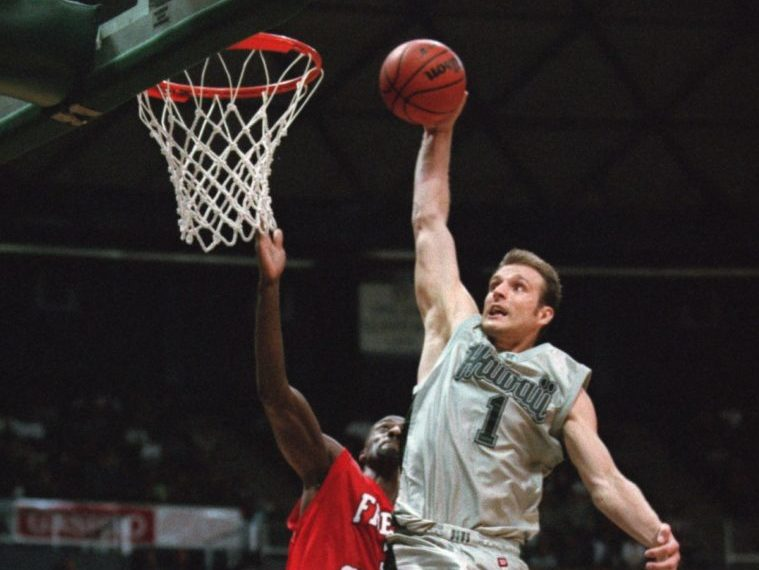

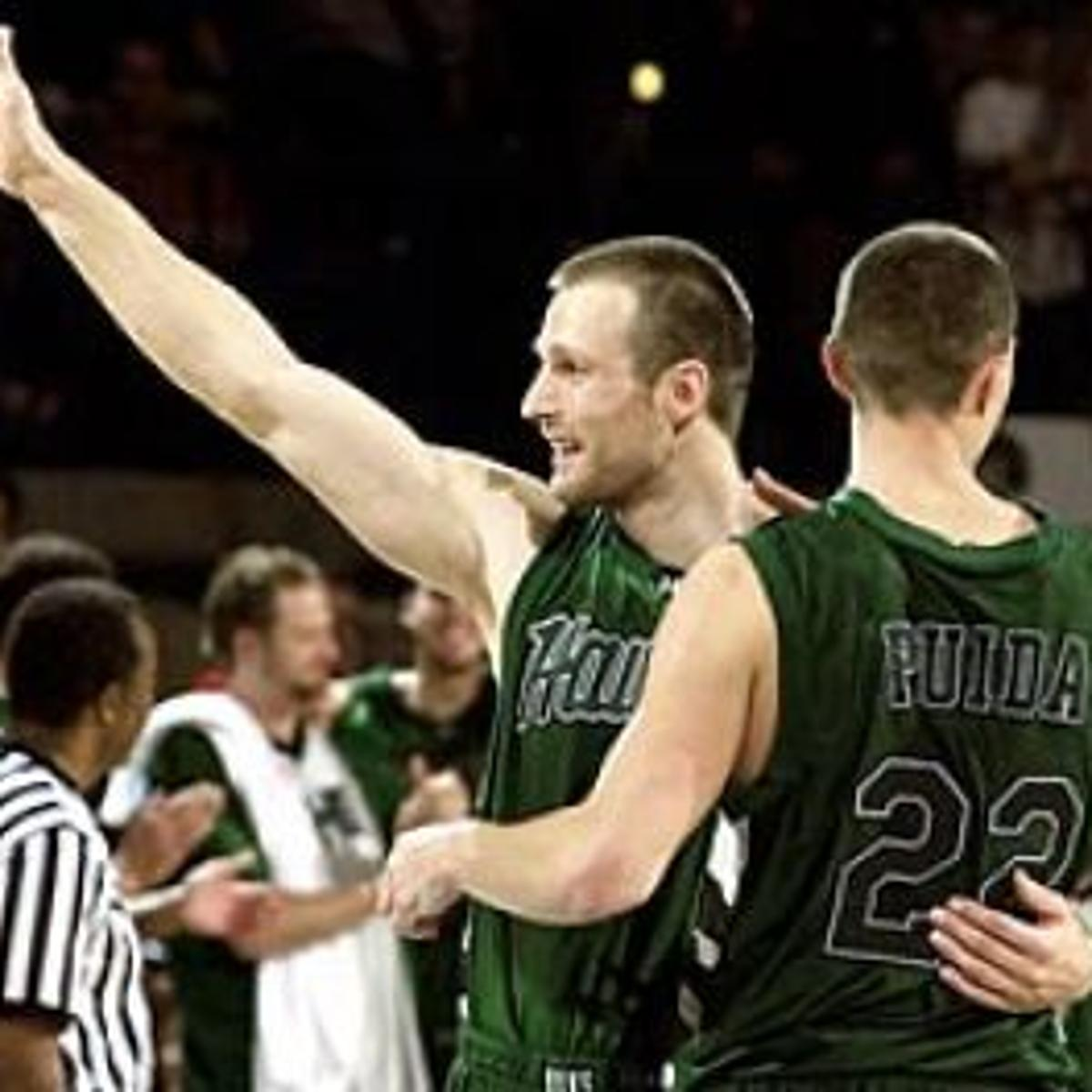
WAC Champions 2002, University of Hawaii

Savović was born in Pula, SR Croatia, at the time part of SFR Yugoslavia, to a family of Montenegrin descent. He attended Ivan Goran Kovačić High School in Herceg Novi, Montenegro. He attended the University of Alabama-Birmingham (UAB) from 1997 to 1998 and then the University of Hawaii at Manoa, in the U.S., from 1998 to 2002. He holds degrees in International Business and Finance as well as Economics from the University of Hawaii at Manoa. He also holds an EMBA Degree from University of Deusto, Deusto Business School. Predrag was a first-team All-Western Athletic Conference pick in his junior and senior seasons, the MVP of the 2002 WAC tournament, and an honorable mention All-American selection by the Associated Press. Hawaii advanced to the first round of the NCAA tournament of 2002.

== Career ==
Savović grew up playing for Partizan Belgrade, Beovuk, and IVA Zorka Pharm Šabac. He moved to the American NCAA even though he was well into his twenties. Undrafted, he signed with the National Basketball Association's Denver Nuggets in 2002, for whom he played during the 2002-03 NBA season, making him one of only few European players at guard position by that time that made a transition from NCAA to NBA without being drafted. He only played in 27 NBA games, totaling 83 points, 25 rebounds and 22 assists. Savović' final NBA game was played on April 2, 2003, in a 75 - 83 loss to the New York Knicks where he played for nearly 5 minutes and had no stats other than three missed field-goals.

For the last five years of his professional basketball career, he has been an important member of Bilbao Basket, a member of ACB League in Spain until his retirement in 2009.

== Personal life and business career ==
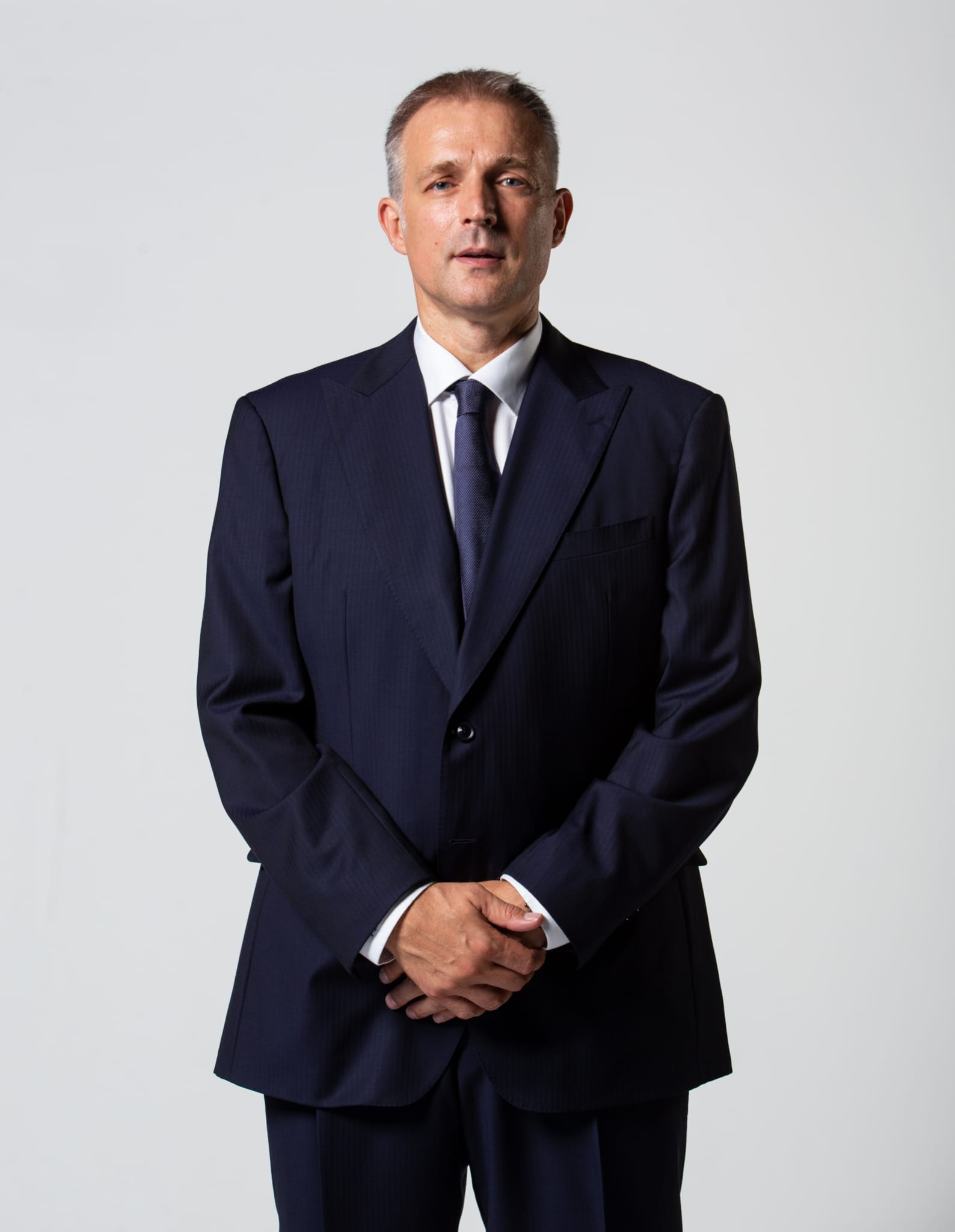

Predrag Savović is a co-founder of IBEXMONT D.O.O:, a boutique AI Powered Real Estate Advisory Firm based in Republic of Montenegro.. He is also a Public Speaker on subject of Team Work and Team Efficiency working closely with many companies in Spain and other European countries. He is also a co-founder of BADAIS INTERNATIONAL a successful flower wholesale business in London UK.

His younger brother, Boban, is also a retired basketball player and an assistant coach of JL Bourg Basket of PRO A French premiere basketball league.

After some years working in Bilbao Basket he became the president of the club in December 2010 until he left the club in the summer of 2017. He held a position as a CEO of Basket Zaragoza 2002 S.A.D. professional basketball club in Spain from 2017 - 2019. From 2019 to 2021 he was employed one more time as a CEO of CD Basket Bilbao Berri S.A.D.

== See also ==
- List of Serbian NBA players
