= Bob Nash (basketball) =

American basketball player and coach (born 1950)

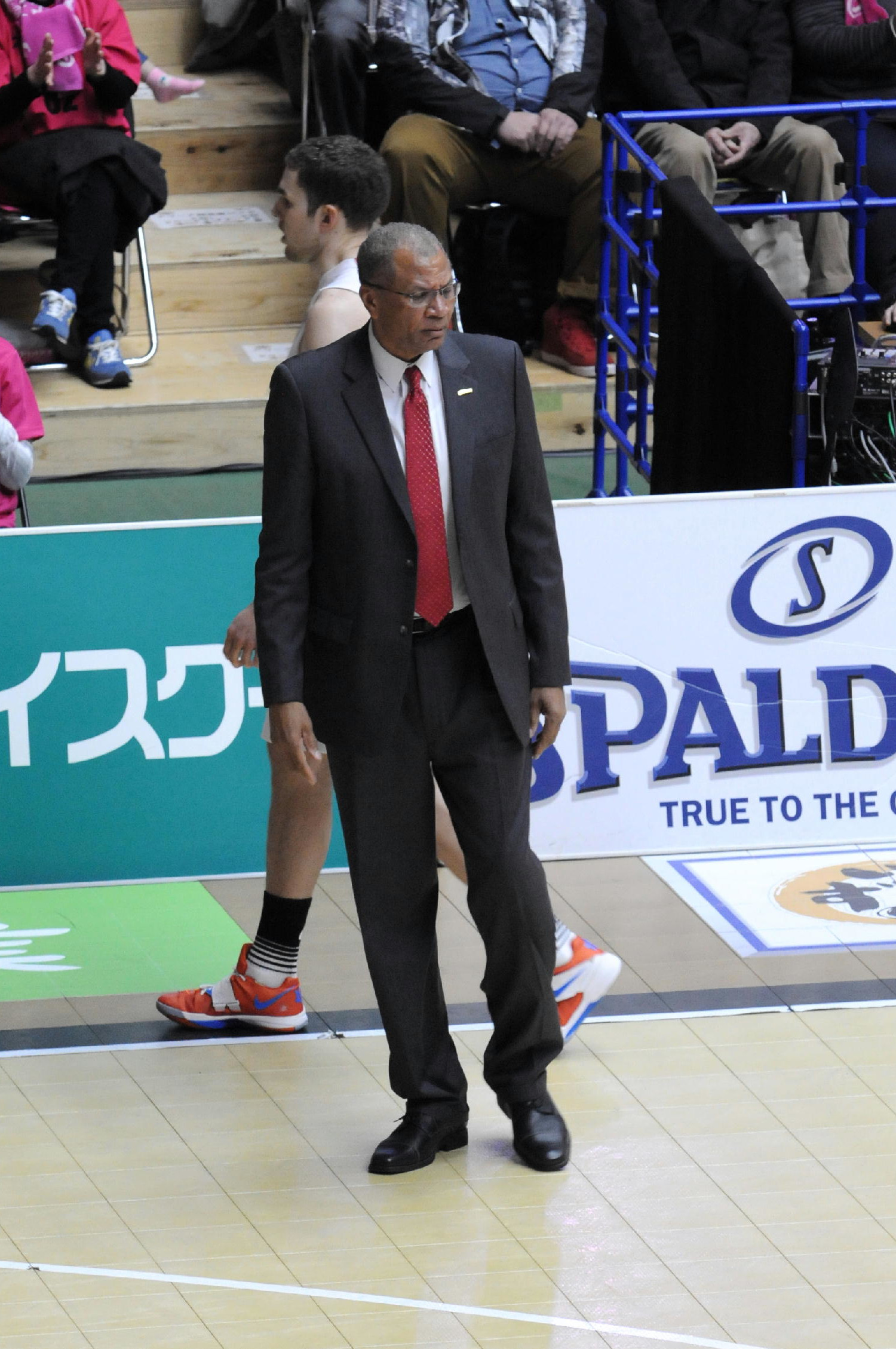
- Nash in 2019

Personal information
- Born: August 24, 1950 (age 76) Hartford, Connecticut, U.S.
- Listed height: 6 ft 8 in (2.03 m)
- Listed weight: 195 lb (88 kg)

Career information
- High school: Hartford Public (Hartford, Connecticut)
- College: San Jacinto (1968–1970); Hawaii (1970–1972)
- NBA draft: 1972: 1st round, 9th overall pick
- Drafted by: Detroit Pistons
- Playing career: 1972–1980
- Position: Small forward
- Number: 33, 4, 55
- Coaching career: 1987–2019

Career history

Playing
- 1972–1974: Detroit Pistons
- 1974–1975: San Diego Conquistadors
- 1977–1979: Kansas City Kings
- 1979–1980: Hawaii Volcanos

Coaching
- 1987–2007: Hawaii (assistant)
- 2007–2010: Hawaii
- 2010–2011: Saitama Broncos
- 2012–2017: Toyama Grouses
- 2018–2019: Rizing Zephyr Fukuoka

Career highlights
- Number 33 retired by Hawaii Rainbow Warriors
- Stats at NBA.com
- Stats at Basketball Reference

Robert Lee Nash (born August 24, 1950) is an American former professional basketball player and coach. He played college basketball for the Hawaii Rainbow Warriors and was the ninth overall pick in the 1972 NBA draft. Nash played six seasons in the National Basketball Association (NBA) for the Detroit Pistons and Kansas City Kings. He also played in the American Basketball Association with the San Diego Conquistadors and the Continental Basketball Association with the Hawaii Volcanos for one season each.

After his playing career, Nash served as an assistant coach for the Hawaii Rainbow Warriors for twenty years. He was appointed as head coach in 2007 and served for three seasons. Nash relocated to Japan in 2010 and served as the head coach of the Saitama Broncos, Toyama Grouses and Rizing Zephyr Fukuoka.

== Career ==
A 1968 graduate of Hartford Public High School, Nash played college basketball for the UH-Manoa in the early 1970s and was a member of the school's most successful men's basketball team up to the time.

Nash played professionally during the 1970s as a member of the Detroit Pistons, San Diego Conquistadors and Kansas City Kings. He played for the Hawaii Volcanos of the Continental Basketball Association during the 1979–80 season. Nash then became an assistant coach at Hawaii in 1987 and held that position until he was promoted to head coach in 2007, taking over for retired Riley Wallace in April 2007 and was fired after the 2009–10 season. He had a 34–56 record as head coach over his three seasons at the helm.

Nash was inducted into the Hartford Public High School Hall of Fame in 2004.

He became the head coach of the Saitama Broncos in the bj league in Japan in 2010, where his son Bobby also played. Nash left the team after the March 11 Japanese earthquake as the team shut down for the rest of the season. Nash served as the head coach for the Toyama Grouses in the bj league from 2012 to 2017.

== Career playing statistics ==
Legend
GP	Games played	GS	Games started	MPG	Minutes per game
FG%	Field goal percentage	3P%	3-point field goal percentage	FT%	Free throw percentage
RPG	Rebounds per game	APG	Assists per game	SPG	Steals per game
BPG	Blocks per game	PPG	Points per game	**Bold**	Career high
*	Led the league

=== NBA/ABA ===
==== Regular season ====
Year	Team	GP	MPG	FG%	3P%	FT%	RPG	APG	SPG	BPG	PPG
1972–73	Detroit (NBA)	36	4.7	.222		.647	.9	.4			1.2
1973–74	Detroit (NBA)	35	8.0	.357		.615	2.1	.4	.1	**.3**	3.0
1974–75	San Diego (ABA)	17	10.3	.346	.000	.722	**3.2**	.7	.2	.1	3.9
1977–78	Kansas City (NBA)	66	12.1	**.516**		.725	2.6	.7	**.4**	**.3**	5.5
1978–79	Kansas (NBA)	**82***	**15.9**	.435		**.802**	2.5	**.9**	**.4**	.2	**6.4**
Career (NBA)		219	11.7	.435		.730	2.2	.7	.3	.2	4.7
Career (overall)		236	11.6	.429	.000	.729	2.3	.7	.3	.2	4.7

==== Playoffs ====
Year	Team	GP	MPG	FG%	FT%	RPG	APG	SPG	BPG	PPG
1979	Kansas (NBA)	5	12.8	.296	.800	2.2	.0	.0	.8	4.8

== Head coaching record ==
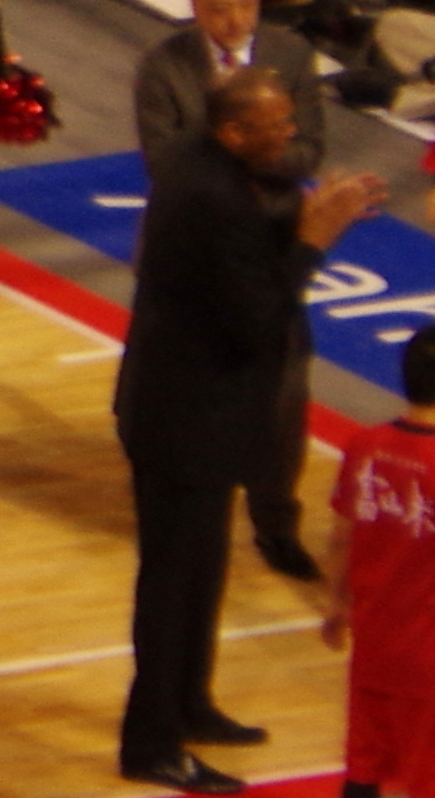
Nash coaching Toyama at bj league finals

Record table
Season	Team	Overall	Conference	Standing	Postseason
Hawaii (Western Athletic Conference) (2007–2010)
2007–08	Hawaii	11–19	7–9	5th	
2008–09	Hawaii	13–17	5–11	8th	
2009–10	Hawaii	10–20	3–13	9th	
Hawaii:		34–56 (.378)	15–33 (.313)		
Total:		34–56 (.378)			
National champion Postseason invitational champion Conference regular season champion Conference regular season and conference tournament champion Division regular season champion Division regular season and conference tournament champion Conference tournament champion

Legend
Regular season	G	Games coached	W	Games won	L	Games lost	W–L %	Win–loss %
Playoffs	PG	Playoff games	PW	Playoff wins	PL	Playoff losses	PW–L %	Playoff win–loss %

Team	Year	G	W	L	W–L%	Finish	PG	PW	PL	PW–L%	Result
Saitama Broncos	2010-11	38	14	24	.368	-	-	-	-	–	-
Toyama Grouses	2012-13	52	35	17	.673	3rd in Eastern	6	3	3	.500	Lost in 2nd round
Toyama Grouses	2013-14	52	42	10	.808	1st in Eastern	4	2	2	.500	3rd place
Toyama Grouses	2014-15	52	35	17	.673	5th in Eastern	2	0	2	.000	Lost in 1st round
Toyama Grouses	2015-16	52	39	13	.750	1st in Eastern	6	5	1	.833	Eastern Champions
Toyama Grouses	2016-17	60	18	42	.300	5th in Central	-	-	-	–	-
Rizing Zephyr Fukuoka	2018-19	53	12	41	.226	6th in Western	-	-	-	–	relegated to B2
