= Hawaii Rainbow Warriors basketball =

Men's sports team of the University of Hawaii

2026–27 Hawaii Rainbow Warriors basketball team
- University: University of Hawaiʻi at Mānoa
- Athletic director: Matt Elliott
- Head coach: Eran Ganot (12th season)
- Location: Honolulu, Hawaii, United States
- Arena: Stan Sheriff Center (capacity: 10,300)
- Conference: Mountain West
- Nickname: Rainbow Warriors
- Colors: Green, black, silver, and white

NCAA Division I tournament round of 32
- 2016

NCAA Division I tournament appearances
- 1972, 1994, 2001, 2002, 2016, 2026

Conference tournament champions
- WAC: 1994, 2001, 2002 Big West: 2016, 2026

Conference regular-season champions
- WAC: 1997, 2002 Big West: 2016

Uniforms
Home	Away	Alternate

The Hawaii Rainbow Warriors basketball team represents the University of Hawaiʻi at Mānoa in NCAA men's competition (women's sports teams at the school are known as "Rainbow Wahine"). The team currently competes in the Mountain West Conference (MW). The Rainbow Warriors have appeared six times in the NCAA Division I men's basketball tournament, most recently in 2026.

The team got their first NCAA Tournament victory in 2016. The Rainbow Warriors are coached by Eran Ganot, with former NBA player Patty Mills serving as the team’s general manager.

== Season-by-season results ==
Record table
Season	Coach	Overall	Conference	Standing	Postseason
1912–13	No Coach	6–1			
1914–15	No Coach	3–4			
1915–16	No Coach	4–1			
David L. Crawford (1918–1919)
1918–19	David L. Crawford	2–5			
David L. Crawford:		2–5			
Edward Williford (1919–1920)
1919–20	Edward Williford	2–5			
Edward Williford:		2–5			
Otto Klum (1921–1923)
1921–22	Otto Klum	11–5			
1922–23	Otto Klum	2–3			
Otto Klum:		13–8			
Charles Jones (1923–1926)
1923–24	Charles Jones	3–4			
1924–25	Charles Jones	7–3			
1925–26	Charles Jones	2–4			
Charles Jones:		12–11			
Leslie Harrison (1926–1929)
1926–27	Leslie Harrison	6–2			
1927–28	Leslie Harrison	3–4			
1928–29	Leslie Harrison	3–4			
Leslie Harrison:		12–10			
Claude Swann (1929–1930)
1929–30	Claude Swann	3–4			
Claude Swann:		3–4			
Eugene Gill (1930–1941)
1930–31	Eugene Gill	8–0			
1931–32	Eugene Gill	9–0			
1932–33	Eugene Gill	11–5			
1933–34	Eugene Gill	2–4			
1934–35	Eugene Gill	8–3			
1935–36	Eugene Gill	8–7			
1936–37	Eugene Gill	9–3			
1937–38	Eugene Gill	5–9			
1938–39	Eugene Gill	7–6			
1939–40	Eugene Gill	10–4			
1940–41	Eugene Gill	11–6			
Eugene Gill:		88–47			
Bert Chan Wa (1941–1947)
1941–42	Bert Chan Wa	3–5			
1946–47	Bert Chan Wa	9–8			
Bert Chan Wa:		12–13			
Art Gallon (1947–1951)
1947–48	Art Gallon	23–3			
1948–49	Art Gallon	21–6			NAIA First Round
1949–50	Art Gallon	22–17			
1950–51	Art Gallon	16–11			
Art Gallon:		83–37			
Al Saake (1951–1954)
1951–52	Al Saake	7–11			
1952–53	Al Saake	12–15			
1953–54	Al Saake	13–17			
Al Saake:		32–43	—		
Ah Chew Goo (1954–1957)
1954–55	Ah Chew Goo	5–16			
1955–56	Ah Chew Goo	14–12			
1956–57	Ah Chew Goo	12–18			
Ah Chew Goo:		31–46			
Al Saake (1957–1963)
1957–58	Al Saake	9–11			
1958–59	Al Saake	12–12			
1959–60	Al Saake	9–18			
1960–61	Al Saake	10–11			
1961–62	Al Saake	8–13			
1962–63	Al Saake	12–16			
Al Saake:		60–81			
Red Rocha (1963–1973)
1963–64	Red Rocha	8–11			
1964–65	Red Rocha	6–17			
1965–66	Red Rocha	2–24			
1966–67	Red Rocha	4–20			
1967–68	Red Rocha	16–9			
1968–69	Red Rocha	8–16			
1969–70	Red Rocha	6–20			
1970–71	Red Rocha	23–5			NIT Second Round
1971–72	Red Rocha	24–3			NCAA University Division First Round
1972–73	Red Rocha	15–11			
Red Rocha:		112–136			
Bruce O'Neil (1973–1976)
1973–74	Bruce O'Neil	19–9			NIT Second Round
1974–75	Bruce O'Neil	14–11			
1975–76; First 21 games	Bruce O'Neil	9–12			
Bruce O'Neil:		42–32			
Rick Pitino (1976)
1975–76; Last 6 games	Rick Pitino	2–4			
Rick Pitino:		2–4			
Larry Little (Independent) (1976–1979)
1976–77	Larry Little	9–18			
1977–78	Larry Little	1–26			
1978–79	Larry Little	10–17			
Larry Little (Western Athletic Conference) (1979–1985)
1979–80	Larry Little	13–14	4–10	6th	
1980–81	Larry Little	14–13	7–9	6th	
1981–82	Larry Little	17–10	9–7	4th	
1982–83	Larry Little	17–11	9–7	4th	
1983–84	Larry Little	12–16	6–10	6th	
1984–85	Larry Little	10–18	5–11	8th	
Larry Little:		103–143	40–54		
Frank Arnold (Western Athletic Conference) (1985–1987)
1985–86	Frank Arnold	4–24	1–15	9th	
1986–87	Frank Arnold	7–21	2–14	8th	
Frank Arnold:		11–45	3–29		
Riley Wallace (Western Athletic Conference) (1987–2007)
1987–88	Riley Wallace	4–25	2–14	9th	
1988–89	Riley Wallace	17–13	9–7	4th	NIT First Round
1989–90	Riley Wallace	25–10	10–6	3rd	NIT Quarterfinals
1990–91	Riley Wallace	16–13	7–9	5th	
1991–92	Riley Wallace	16–12	9–7	4th	
1992–93	Riley Wallace	12–16	7–11	7th	
1993–94	Riley Wallace	18–15	11–7	4th	NCAA Division I First Round
1994–95	Riley Wallace	16–13	8–10	6th	
1995–96	Riley Wallace	10–18	7–11	8th	
1996–97	Riley Wallace	21–8	12–4	1st	NIT Second Round
1997–98	Riley Wallace	21–9	8–6	4th	NIT Quarterfinals
1998–99	Riley Wallace	6–20	3–11	7th	
1999–00	Riley Wallace	17–12	5–9	6th	
2000–01	Riley Wallace	17–14	8–8	5th	NCAA Division I First Round
2001–02	Riley Wallace	27–6	15–3	1st	NCAA Division I First Round
2002–03	Riley Wallace	19–12	9–9	6th	NIT Second Round
2003–04	Riley Wallace	21–12	11–7	5th	NIT Quarterfinals
2004–05	Riley Wallace	16–13	7–11	7th	
2005–06	Riley Wallace	17–11	10–6	4th	
2006–07	Riley Wallace	18–13	8–8	5th	
Riley Wallace:		334–265	166–164		
Bob Nash (Western Athletic Conference) (2007–2010)
2007–08	Bob Nash	11–19	7–9	5th	
2008–09	Bob Nash	13–17	5–11	8th	
2009–10	Bob Nash	10–20	3–13	9th	
Bob Nash:		34–56	15–33		
Gib Arnold (Western Athletic Conference) (2010–2012)
2010–11	Gib Arnold	19–13	8–8	5th	CIT Second Round
2011–12	Gib Arnold	16–16	6–8	5th	
Gib Arnold (Big West Conference) (2012–2014)
2012–13	Gib Arnold	17–15	10–8	5th	CIT First Round
2013–14	Gib Arnold	20–11	9–7	4th	
Gib Arnold:		72–55	33–31		
Benjy Taylor (Big West Conference) (2014–2015)
2014–15	Benjy Taylor	22–13	8–8	5th	(interim)
Benjy Taylor:		22–13	8–8		
Eran Ganot (Big West Conference) (2015–2026)
2015–16	Eran Ganot	28–6	13–3	1st	NCAA Division I Second Round
2016–17	Eran Ganot	14–16	8–8	5th	
2017–18	Eran Ganot	17–13	8–8	6th	
2018–19	Eran Ganot	18–13	9–7	4th	
2019–20; First 13 games	Chris Gerlufsen	8–5	0–0	(acting)	
2019–20; Last 17 games	Eran Ganot	9–8	8–8	4th	
2020–21	Eran Ganot	11–10	9–9	6th	
2021–22	Eran Ganot	17–11	10–5	3rd	
2022–23	Eran Ganot	22–11	13–7	5th	
2023–24	Eran Ganot	20–14	11-9	4th	
2024–25	Eran Ganot	15–16	7–13	9th	
2025–26	Eran Ganot	24–9	14–6	2nd	NCAA Division I Round of 64
Eran Ganot (Mountain West Conference) (2026–present)
Eran Ganot:		188–126	105–81		
Total:		1,282–1,186			
National champion Postseason invitational champion Conference regular season champion Conference regular season and conference tournament champion Division regular season champion Division regular season and conference tournament champion Conference tournament champion

== Postseason history ==
=== NCAA tournament results ===
The Rainbow Warriors have appeared in six NCAA tournaments. Their combined record is 1–6. Number in parentheses is opponent's seed in tournament. The Rainbow Warriors' first tournament appearance with seeds (The NCAA started seeding teams with the 1978 tournament, with the seeding format used today beginning in 1979) was in 1994.

Year	Seed	Round	Opponent	Result
1972	N/A	First Round	Weber State	L 64–91
1994	13	First Round	(4) No. 15 Syracuse	L 78–92
2001	12	First Round	(5) No. 17 Syracuse	L 69–79
2002	10	First Round	(7) No. 22 Xavier	L 58–70
2016	13	First Round; Second Round	(4) No. 23 California (5) No. 18 Maryland	W 77–66; L 60–73
2026	13	First Round	(4) No. 17 Arkansas	L 78–97

=== NIT results ===
The Rainbow Warriors have appeared in eight National Invitational Tournaments (NIT). Their combined record is 10–8.

Year	Round	Opponent	Result
1971	First Round; Quarterfinals	Oklahoma; St. Bonaventure	W 88–87; L 64–73
1974	First Round; Quarterfinals	Fairfield; Purdue	W 66–65; L 72–85
1989	First Round	California	L 57–73
1990	First Round; Second Round; Quarterfinals	Stanford; Long Beach State; New Mexico	W 69–57; W 84–79; L 58–80
1997	First Round; Second Round	Oregon; UNLV	W 71–61; L 80–89
1998	First Round; Second Round; Quarterfinals	Arizona State; Gonzaga; Fresno State	W 90–73; W 78–70; L 83–85
2003	First Round; Second Round	UNLV; Minnesota	W 85–68; L 70–84
2004	First Round; Second Round; Quarterfinals	Utah State; Nebraska; Michigan	W 85–74; W 84–83; L 73–88

=== CIT results ===
The Rainbow Warriors have appeared in two CollegeInsider.com Postseason Tournament (CIT). They have a combined record of 1–2.

Year	Round	Opponent	Result
2011	First Round; Second Round	Portland; San Francisco	W 76–64; L 74–77
2013	First Round	Air Force	L 65–69

=== NAIA tournament results ===
The Rainbow Warriors have appeared in the NAIA Tournament one time. Their combined record is 0–1.

Year	Round	Opponent	Result
1949	First Round	North Dakota	L 53–70

== Coaches ==
Coach	Tenure	Record	Pct.
Dave Crawford	1918–1919	2–5	.286
Edward Williford	1919–1920	2–5	.286
Otto Klum	1921–1923	13–8	.619
Charles Jones	1923–1926	12–11	.522
Leslie Harrison	1926–1929	12–10	.545
Claude Swann	1929–1930	3–4	.429
Eugene Gill	1930–1941	88–47	.652
Bert Chan Wa	1941–1942, 1946–1947	12–13	.480
Art Gallon	1947–1951	83–37	.692
Al Saake	1951–1954, 1957–1963	92–124	.426
Ah Chew Goo	1954–1957	31–46	.403
Red Rocha	1963–1973	112–136	.452
Bruce O'Neil	1973–1976	42–32	.568
Rick Pitino	1976	2–4	.333
Larry Little	1976–1985	103–143	.419
Frank Arnold	1985–1987	11–45	.452
Riley Wallace	1987–2007	334–265	.558
Bob Nash	2007–2010	34–56	.378
Gib Arnold	2010–2014	72–55	.567
Benjy Taylor	2014–2015	22–13	.629
Eran Ganot	2016–present	171–118	.592

== Notable players ==
=== Retired numbers ===
The Rainbow Warriors retired their first number in program history on February 15, 2020, honoring number 33 for UH great and coach Bob Nash. The program retired its second number on February 21, 2026, honoring number 23 for Anthony Carter.

Hawaii Rainbow Warriors retired numbers
No.	Player	Pos.	Career	No. ret.	Ref.
23	Anthony Carter	PG	1996–1998	2026	
33	Bob Nash	SF	1970–1972	2020	

=== All-Americans ===
- 1971–1972: Bob Nash (Third team – "Basketball News", Honorable Mention – UPI, AP, Universal Sports)
- 1972–1973: Tom Henderson (Honorable Mention – NBA Coaches, Sporting News, Basketball Weekly)
- 1973–1974: Tom Henderson (First Team – Sporting News, NBA Coaches, Street & Smith's Basketball Yearbook, Citizens Savings Athletic Foundation) (Second Team – Basketball Weekly, Universal Sports), (Third Team- AP), (Honorable Mention-UPI)
- 1995–1996: Anthony Harris (Honorable Mention – Basketball Weekly)
- 1996–1997: Anthony Carter (Honorable Mention – AP)
- 1997–1998: Anthony Carter (Honorable Mention – AP)
- 2001–2002: Predrag Savović (Honorable Mention – AP)

=== NBA draft ===
- 1971: Tom Newell – Round 10 – Phoenix Suns
- 1972: Bob Nash – Round 1 – Detroit Pistons
- 1972: Dwight Holiday – Round 9 – Seattle SuperSonics
- 1973: John Penebacker – Round 13 – Cleveland Cavaliers
- 1974: Tom Henderson – Round 1 – Atlanta Hawks
- 1975: Jimmie Baker – Round 3 – Philadelphia 76ers
- 1975: Victor Kelly – Round 10 – Atlanta Hawks
- 1976: Tom Barker – Round 4 – Atlanta Hawks
- 1981: Aaron Strayhorn – Round 6 – Cleveland Cavaliers
- 1982: Clarence Dickerson – Round 5 – Washington Bullets
- 1989: Reggie Cross – Round 2 – Philadelphia 76ers

=== NBA free agents ===
- Anthony Carter
- Trevor Ruffin
- Predrag Savović

=== NBA champions ===
- Phil Handy
- Tom Henderson

=== EuroLeague and international players ===
- Jared Dillinger
- Carl English
- Isaac Fotu
- Stefan Janković
- Vander Joaquim
- Matt Lojeski
- Sammis Reyes (born 1995), Chilean player who played for the Chilean national basketball team and later switched to American football by the 2020s
- Christian Standhardinger
- Aaron Valdes (born 1993)
- Luc-Arthur Vebobe
- Brandon Jawato
- Akira Jacobs, Team Japan at the 2024 Summer Olympics

== Facilities ==
The Rainbow Warriors play at the 10,300 seat Stan Sheriff Center, which opened in 1994. Originally called the "Special Events Arena" it was renamed in 1998 after Stan Sheriff, the former UH Athletics Director, who had lobbied for its construction. Previously, the team had played from 1964–1994 at the 7,500 seat Neal S. Blaisdell Center (originally the Honolulu International Center) and prior to that at the "Otto "Proc" Klum Gymnasium".

== See also ==
- Hawaii Rainbow Wahine basketball
