= List of schools in Tulsa, Oklahoma =

List of schools in Tulsa, Oklahoma, United States.

== Districts ==
=== Public K-12 ===
Tulsa Public Schools is the largest school district in Oklahoma.

The public school districts in the city of Tulsa are:

- Tulsa, Oklahoma Public Schools
- Union, Oklahoma Public Schools

=== Private K-12 ===
There are multiple private elementary and middle schools in the Tulsa metropolitan area. Most are affiliated with a specific religion or place of worship. Among the largest are:

- Bishop Kelley High School (9-12) (Catholic, Lasallian)
- Cascia Hall Preparatory School (6-12) (Catholic, Augustinian)
- Holland Hall (Pre-12) (Episcopal)
- Lincoln Christian School (Tulsa, OK) (Pre-12)
- Metro Christian Academy (Pre-12) (Interdenominational Christian)
- Tristan Novotny Institute for Accelerated Youth (Pre-12)(Preparatory)
- Mingo Valley Christian School (Pre-12) (Nondenominational Christian)
- Monte Cassino School (Pre-8) (Catholic, Benedictine)
- Victory Christian School (K-12) (Victory Christian Center Church, interdenominational)
- Augustine Christian Academy (K-12) (Non-denominational, Evangelical)
- Riverfield Country Day School (Infants-12) (Not religiously affiliated)

Other private schools in the Tulsa area include many schools operated by the Roman Catholic Diocese of Tulsa (sometimes with help from religious orders). Among them are:

- All Saints Catholic School (P-8)
- Holy Family Classical School (P-12)
- Marian Academy (P-5)
- Marquette Catholic School (P-8)
- Saint Catherine School (P-8)
- Saint John Catholic School (K-8)
- Saint Pius X Catholic School (P-8)
- Saints Peter & Paul Catholic School (P-8)
- Saint Joseph Catholic School (P-8)
- School of St. Mary (P-8)

== High schools ==
- Tulsa Public Schools
  - Booker T. Washington High School, Tulsa
  - Central High School, Tulsa
  - East Central High School, Tulsa
  - Edison Preparatory School, Tulsa
  - McLain High School for Science and Technology, Tulsa
  - Memorial High School, Tulsa
  - Nathan Hale High School, Tulsa
  - Will Rogers High School, Tulsa
  - Daniel Webster High School, Tulsa
- Union Public Schools, Tulsa
  - Union High School
- Augustine Christian Academy, Tulsa
- Berryhill High School, Tulsa
- Bishop Kelley High School, Tulsa
- Cascia Hall Preparatory School, Tulsa
- Charles Page High School, Sand Springs
- Dove Science Academy, Tulsa
- Holland Hall, Tulsa
- Metro Christian Academy, Tulsa
- Mingo Valley Christian School, Tulsa
- Riverfield Country Day School, Tulsa
- Tulsa School of Arts and Sciences, Tulsa
- Victory Christian School, Tulsa
- Wright Christian Academy, Tulsa

== Other schools and institutions ==
- University Language Institute - Tulsa (private English as a second language)
- Discovery School of Tulsa (K-9)
