= 2021–22 NFL playoffs =

American football tournament

- Dates: January 15 – February 13, 2022
- Season: 2021
- Teams: 14
- Games played: 13
- Super Bowl LVI site: SoFi Stadium; Inglewood, California
- Defending champions: Tampa Bay Buccaneers
- Champion: Los Angeles Rams (4th title)
- Runner-up: Cincinnati Bengals
- Conference runners-up: Kansas City Chiefs; San Francisco 49ers
NFL playoffs
← 2020–21	2022–23 →

The National Football League playoffs for the 2021 season was the first time that the league featured a 17-game regular season schedule, and consequently the start of the playoffs was pushed a week later to January 15, 2022. The postseason concluded with Super Bowl LVI on February 13 at SoFi Stadium in Inglewood, California, with the NFC's fourth seed, the Los Angeles Rams, defeating the AFC's fourth seed, the Cincinnati Bengals. Cincinnati won their first playoff game since 1990 by defeating the Las Vegas Raiders.

This was the first postseason since 2010–11 where neither of the first-seeded teams made it to their respective championships, and it was also the first postseason since 2009–10 in which neither the Green Bay Packers nor New England Patriots reached a conference championship game. This was also the first postseason since 2012–13 to have a Super Bowl to not have the New England Patriots, Denver Broncos, or Kansas City Chiefs representing the AFC. For the first time in history, both teams competing in the Super Bowl finished below the second seed. In addition, this was the fourth time since the 1979 NFL season where neither of the number one playoff seeds advanced to their conference's respective championship game, the other instances were 2008 and 2010 .

Of the 13 games played in the playoffs, nine were decided by seven or fewer points. For the final seven postseason games, six were decided by three points. Five of those six were decided with game-winning field goals. The only game that was not decided by three points was the divisional round game between the Bills and Chiefs, which was decided with a game-winning touchdown in overtime.

== Participants ==
Within each conference, the four division winners and the top three non-division winners with the best overall regular season records qualified for the playoffs. The four division winners are seeded 1–4 based on their overall won-lost-tied record, and the wild card teams are seeded 5–7. The NFL does not use a fixed bracket playoff system, and there are no restrictions regarding teams from the same division matching up in any round. In the first round, dubbed the Wild Card playoffs, the second-seeded division winner hosts the seventh seed wild card, the third seed hosts the sixth seed, and the fourth seed hosts the fifth seed. The 1 seed from each conference receives a first-round bye. In the second round, the Divisional playoffs, the number 1 seed hosts the lowest-seeded surviving team from the first round (seed 4, 5, 6, or 7), while the other two surviving teams play each other, with the higher-seeded team hosting. The two surviving teams from each conference's divisional playoff games then meet in the respective AFC and NFC Conference Championships, hosted by the higher seed. Although the Super Bowl, the championship round of the playoffs, is played at a neutral site, the designated home team is based on an annual rotation by conference.

Playoff seeds
Seed	AFC	NFC
1	Tennessee Titans (South winner)	Green Bay Packers (North winner)
2	Kansas City Chiefs (West winner)	Tampa Bay Buccaneers (South winner)
3	Buffalo Bills (East winner)	Dallas Cowboys (East winner)
4	Cincinnati Bengals (North winner)	Los Angeles Rams (West winner)
5	Las Vegas Raiders (wild card)	Arizona Cardinals (wild card)
6	New England Patriots (wild card)	San Francisco 49ers (wild card)
7	Pittsburgh Steelers (wild card)	Philadelphia Eagles (wild card)

== Bracket ==
Jan 16 – AT&T Stadium	Jan 22 – Lambeau Field
6	San Francisco	23
3	Dallas	17
6	San Francisco	13
Jan 30 – SoFi Stadium
Jan 17 – SoFi Stadium	1	Green Bay	10
NFC
5	Arizona	11	6	San Francisco	17
Jan 23 – Raymond James Stadium
4	LA Rams	34	4	LA Rams	20
NFC Championship
Jan 16 – Raymond James Stadium	4	LA Rams	30
2	Tampa Bay	27
7	Philadelphia	15
Divisional playoffs	Feb 13 – SoFi Stadium
2	Tampa Bay	31
Wild-card round
N4	LA Rams	23
Jan 15 – Paul Brown Stadium	Jan 22 – Nissan Stadium	A4	Cincinnati	20
Super Bowl LVI
5	Las Vegas	19
4	Cincinnati	26
4	Cincinnati	19
Jan 30 – Arrowhead Stadium
Jan 15 – Highmark Stadium	1	Tennessee	16
AFC
6	New England	17	4	Cincinnati	27*
Jan 23 – Arrowhead Stadium
3	Buffalo	47	2	Kansas City	24
AFC Championship
Jan 16 – Arrowhead Stadium	3	Buffalo	36
2	Kansas City	42*
7	Pittsburgh	21
2	Kansas City	42

* Indicates overtime victory

== Schedule ==
This postseason marked the first time that the Wild Card playoffs spanned three days. Two games were played on Saturday, three on Sunday, and one on Monday night. The last time that a playoff game was played on a Monday was in 1988, when a Wild Card game was played Monday, December 26, to avoid playing on Christmas.

To avoid a competitive disadvantage, the winner of the Wild Card playoff game played on Monday night gets scheduled to play a Divisional playoff game on Sunday. In addition, the Monday night Wild Card game has traditionally been played between the fourth-seed and fifth-seed in a conference for two reasons:

1. Due to re-seeding, regardless of whomever wins, it's the only matchup where the winner has the same opponent the following week.
2. The schedule for the Divisional playoffs can be released following the conclusion of the Wild Card game played Sunday night.

Round	Away team	Score	Home team	Date	Kickoff (ET / UTC–5)	TV	Viewers (millions)	TV rating
Wild-card round	Las Vegas Raiders	19–26	Cincinnati Bengals	January 15, 2022	4:35 p.m.	NBC	27.7	14.2
Wild-card round	New England Patriots	17–47	Buffalo Bills	January 15, 2022	8:15 p.m.	CBS	26.4	13.2
Wild-card round	Philadelphia Eagles	15–31	Tampa Bay Buccaneers	January 16, 2022	1:05 p.m.	Fox	30.4	16.0
Wild-card round	San Francisco 49ers	23–17	Dallas Cowboys	January 16, 2022	4:40 p.m.	CBS/Nickelodeon	41.5	20.7
Wild-card round	Pittsburgh Steelers	21–42	Kansas City Chiefs	January 16, 2022	8:15 p.m.	NBC	28.9	14.7
Wild-card round	Arizona Cardinals	11–34	Los Angeles Rams	January 17, 2022	8:15 p.m.	ABC/ESPN	23.1	—
Divisional round	Cincinnati Bengals	19–16	Tennessee Titans	January 22, 2022	4:35 p.m.	CBS	30.7	15.8
Divisional round	San Francisco 49ers	13–10	Green Bay Packers	January 22, 2022	8:15 p.m.	Fox	36.9	17.8
Divisional round	Los Angeles Rams	30–27	Tampa Bay Buccaneers	January 23, 2022	3:05 p.m.	NBC	38.1	19.8
Divisional round	Buffalo Bills	36–42 (OT)	Kansas City Chiefs	January 23, 2022	6:40 p.m.	CBS	42.7	21.7
Conference championships	Cincinnati Bengals	27–24 (OT)	Kansas City Chiefs	January 30, 2022	3:05 p.m.	CBS	47.8	23.6
Conference championships	San Francisco 49ers	17–20	Los Angeles Rams	January 30, 2022	6:40 p.m.	Fox	50.4	23.4
Super Bowl LVI SoFi Stadium Inglewood, California	Los Angeles Rams	23–20	Cincinnati Bengals	February 13, 2022	6:40 p.m.	NBC	112.3	36.9

== Wild-card round ==
=== Saturday, January 15, 2022 ===
==== AFC: Cincinnati Bengals 26, Las Vegas Raiders 19 ====
Las Vegas Raiders vs. Cincinnati Bengals – Game summary

Quarter	1	2	3	4	Total
Raiders	3	10	0	6	19
Bengals	10	10	3	3	26

at Paul Brown Stadium, Cincinnati, Ohio

- Date: January 15, 2022
- Game time: 1:35 p.m. PST/4:35 p.m. EST
- Game weather: Cloudy, 32 °F (0 °C)
- Game attendance: 66,277
- Referee: Jerome Boger
- TV announcers (NBC): Mike Tirico, Drew Brees, and Kathryn Tappen
- Recap, Game Book

Game information

First quarter

- LV – Daniel Carlson 47-yard field goal, 9:23. Raiders 3–0. Drive: 10 plays, 47 yards, 5:37.
- CIN – C. J. Uzomah 7-yard pass from Joe Burrow (Evan McPherson kick), 4:31. Bengals 7–3. Drive: 10 plays, 75 yards, 4:52.
- CIN – Evan McPherson 31-yard field goal, 1:15. Bengals 10–3. Drive: 4 plays, 2 yards, 1:46.

Second quarter

- CIN – Evan McPherson 30-yard field goal, 10:20. Bengals 13–3. Drive: 8 plays, 33 yards, 3:52.
- LV – Daniel Carlson 28-yard field goal, 7:55. Bengals 13–6. Drive: 6 plays, 51 yards, 2:25.
- CIN – Tyler Boyd 10-yard pass from Joe Burrow (Evan McPherson kick), 1:51. Bengals 20–6. Drive: 12 plays, 82 yards, 6:04.
- LV – Zay Jones 14-yard pass from Derek Carr (Daniel Carlson kick), 0:13. Bengals 20–13. Drive: 11 plays, 80 yards, 1:38.

Third quarter

- CIN – Evan McPherson 43-yard field goal, 10:56. Bengals 23–13. Drive: 9 plays, 40 yards, 4:04.

Fourth quarter

- LV – Daniel Carlson 34-yard field goal, 14:17. Bengals 23–16. Drive: 13 plays, 57 yards, 7:30.
- CIN – Evan McPherson 28-yard field goal, 6:46. Bengals 26–16. Drive: 13 plays, 65 yards, 7:31.
- LV – Daniel Carlson 28-yard field goal, 3:34. Bengals 26–19. Drive: 12 plays, 67 yards, 3:12.

Top passers

- LV – Derek Carr – 29/54, 310 yards, TD, INT
- CIN – Joe Burrow – 24/34, 244 yards, 2 TD

Top rushers

- LV – Josh Jacobs – 13 rushes, 83 yards
- CIN – Joe Mixon – 17 rushes, 48 yards

Top receivers

- LV – Darren Waller – 7 receptions, 76 yards
- CIN – Ja'Marr Chase – 9 receptions, 116 yards

Bengals linebacker Germaine Pratt's interception on his own 2-yard line in the game's closing seconds gave Cincinnati its first playoff win since the 1990 season, ending the longest active playoff victory drought in the NFL (8 losses over 31 years).

Las Vegas took the opening kickoff and drove 51 yards in 10 plays, featuring a 17-yard completion from Derek Carr to Zay Jones on 3rd-and-2. Daniel Carlson finished the drive with a 47-yard field goal to put the Raiders up 3–0. Cincinnati stormed right back, with Joe Burrow completing three passes to Ja'Marr Chase for 37 yards and a screen pass to Joe Mixon for 21. On 3rd-and-goal from the 7-yard line, he finished the drive with a touchdown pass to tight end C. J. Uzomah to put the Bengals ahead 7–3. On the Raiders' next drive, Carr lost a fumble while being sacked by Trey Hendrickson. Defensive tackle Larry Ogunjobi recovered the ball and returned it 11 yards to the Las Vegas 15-yard line, setting up Evan McPherson's 31-yard field goal to give the Bengals a 10–3 lead with 1:18 left in the first quarter.

On the ensuing kickoff, Raiders returner Peyton Barber fielded the ball too close to the sidelines and stepped out of bounds at his own 2-yard line. Two plays later, Sam Hubbard sacked Carr on the 1 and Trent Taylor's 14-yard punt return gave the Bengals excellent field position on the Raiders 45-yard line. Chase then rushed for 7 yards and caught a pass for 28 as the team drove to the 6 before Quinton Jefferson's third-down sack forced Cincinnati to settle for McPherson's 30-yard field goal, increasing their lead to 13–3. Tyron Johnson returned the ensuing kickoff 35 yards to the 39-yard line. Then Josh Jacobs carried the ball three times for 51 yards on the way to Carlson's 28-yard field goal that cut their deficit to 13–6. Taking the ball back with 7:55 left in the second quarter, Cincinnati drove 82 yards in 12 plays, featuring a 29-yard reception by Uzomah and a 15-yard run by Chase on an end around play on 4th-and-1. On 3rd-and-4 from the Raiders 10-yard line, Burrow ran to the right side of the field and threw the ball to Tyler Boyd for a touchdown just as his foot was about to go out of bounds. The play was controversial, as one of the officials blew his whistle slightly before Boyd made the catch, while the ball was still in the air, which, according to NFL rules should have resulted in the down having to be replayed, but the touchdown stood and it gave the Bengals a 20–6 lead with 1:51 left on the clock. Carr then completed 5 passes for 56 yards and rushed for 20 as he led his team 75 yards in 12 plays to score on his 14-yard touchdown pass to Jones with 14 seconds left in the half, making the score 20–13 going into halftime.

Bengals running back Chris Evans returned the second half kickoff 27 yards to the 35-yard line, where the team proceeded to drive 45 yards in 9 plays to score on McPherson's 43-yard field goal, giving them a 23–13 lead. On the Raiders' next drive, Hunter Renfrow caught a long pass from Carr on the Bengals 36 on third down and then lost the ball out of bounds when Jessie Bates knocked it out of his hands. The play was initially ruled a completion and fumble out of bounds, but Bengals coach Zac Taylor's replay challenge overturned the call and it was ruled an incompletion, forcing Las Vegas to punt. Cincinnati also ended up punting on their next possession, due to a third-down sack by Maxx Crosby. Then Las Vegas drove 76 yards in 12 plays, with Jacobs rushing 4 times for 25 yards and catching a pass for 7. The team made it all the way to Bengals 9-yard line, but then a holding penalty by guard John Simpson eliminated Jacobs' 8-yard run and pushed them back to the 19. The team was unable to get back to the end zone and ended up settling for Carlson's 34-yard field goal, cutting their deficit to 23–16 on the last play of the third quarter.

Cincinnati took the ball back and drove 65 yards in 13 plays, taking 7:31 off the clock. Burrow completed 6/7 passes for 56 yards, including a 19-yard completion to Chase of 3rd-and-7. On 3rd-and-1 from the Raiders' 10-yard line, Mixon was tackled inches short of the first down marker, forcing Cincinnati to settle for McPherson's 28-yard field goal to give them a 26–16 lead with 6:46 left in the game. The Raiders responded by advancing 67 yards in 12 plays, featuring Carr's 26-yard completion to DeSean Jackson on 4th-and-5. The Bengals defense halted the drive on their own 10 when Hubbard deflected Carr's pass on 3rd-and-3, but Carlson's fourth field goal made it a one-score game at 26–19 with 3:37 remaining on the clock. Then the Raiders forced a three-and-out, getting the ball back on their own 35-yard line with 1:51 left and no timeouts. On their first play, a roughing the passer penalty on Khalid Kareem turned Jacobs 15-yard reception into a 30-yard gain. An incompletion and a sack by B. J. Hill brought up 3rd-and-17, but then Carr completed a 23-yard pass to tight end Darren Waller on the Bengals 19. After two incompletions, Carr threw a 10-yard pass to Jones at the 9. Then he spiked the ball to stop the clock, giving the Raiders three chances to score with 29 seconds remaining. Two incompletions brought up 4th-and-goal. Then with 17 seconds left, Pratt intercepted Carr's pass and enabled Cincinnati to escape with a win.

Burrow completed 24 of 34 passes for 244 yards and two touchdowns. Chase caught 9 passes for 116 yards and rushed three times for 23. In addition to his interception, Pratt added 9 tackles (6 solo). Evans returned 5 kickoffs for 103 yards and rushed for 9. Carr finished the game 29/54 for 310 yards, a touchdown, an interception, and 20 rushing yards. Jacobs rushed for 83 yards and caught 4 passes for 44.

==== AFC: Buffalo Bills 47, New England Patriots 17 ====
New England Patriots vs. Buffalo Bills – Game summary

Quarter	1	2	3	4	Total
Patriots	0	3	7	7	17
Bills	14	13	6	14	47

at Highmark Stadium, Orchard Park, New York

- Date: January 15, 2022
- Game time: 8:15 p.m. EST
- Game weather: Clear, 7 °F (−14 °C)
- Game attendance: 69,188
- Referee: Brad Allen
- TV announcers (CBS): Ian Eagle, Charles Davis, and Evan Washburn
- Recap, Game Book

Game information

First quarter

- BUF – Dawson Knox 8-yard pass from Josh Allen (Tyler Bass kick), 9:45. Bills 7–0. Drive: 9 plays, 70 yards, 5:15.
- BUF – Dawson Knox 11-yard pass from Josh Allen (Tyler Bass kick), 0:40. Bills 14–0. Drive: 10 plays, 80 yards, 5:00.

Second quarter

- BUF – Devin Singletary 3-yard run (kick blocked), 7:20. Bills 20–0. Drive: 10 plays, 81 yards, 6:03.
- BUF – Devin Singletary 16-yard run (Tyler Bass kick), 1:53 . Bills 27–0. Drive: 4 plays, 89 yards, 1:51.
- NE – Nick Folk 44-yard field goal, 0:01. Bills 27–3. Drive: 10 plays, 49 yards, 1:52.

Third quarter

- BUF – Emmanuel Sanders 34-yard pass from Josh Allen (kick blocked), 8:48. Bills 33–3. Drive: 6 plays, 58 yards, 4:05.
- NE – Kendrick Bourne 3-yard pass from Mac Jones (Nick Folk kick), 4:12. Bills 33–10. Drive: 11 plays, 75 yards, 4:36.

Fourth quarter

- BUF – Gabe Davis 19-yard pass from Josh Allen (Tyler Bass kick), 13:22. Bills 40–10. Drive: 9 plays, 77 yards, 5:50.
- BUF – Tommy Doyle 1-yard pass from Josh Allen (Tyler Bass kick), 8:37. Bills 47–10. Drive: 3 plays, 39 yards, 1:36.
- NE – Kendrick Bourne 4-yard pass from Mac Jones (Nick Folk kick), 1:44. Bills 47–17. Drive: 15 plays, 73 yards, 6:53.

Top passers

- NE – Mac Jones – 24/38, 232 yards, 2 TD, 2 INT
- BUF – Josh Allen – 21/25, 308 yards, 5 TD

Top rushers

- NE – Damien Harris – 9 rushes, 30 yards
- BUF – Devin Singletary – 16 rushes, 81 yards, 2 TD

Top receivers

- NE – Kendrick Bourne – 7 receptions, 77 yards, 2 TD
- BUF – Dawson Knox – 5 receptions, 89 yards, 2 TD

In their first postseason meeting since 1963, Buffalo beat the Patriots with 483 yards of offense and touchdowns on every drive except their last one, when they intentionally ran out the clock. It marked the first game in NFL history where a team played an entire game without punting, kicking a field goal, facing a fourth down, or turning the ball over (on downs nor by fumble or interception), as well as the first time a team scored seven touchdowns on seven consecutive drives.

In the first half alone, Buffalo ran 33 plays and gained over 300 yards. They started off the game with a 9-play, 70-yard drive in which Josh Allen rushed twice for 41 yards and completed 4/5 passes for 24, the last an 8-yard touchdown pass to tight end Dawson Knox. New England responded with a drive to the Bills 34, but Micah Hyde ended the drive by intercepting Mac Jones' pass in the end zone. Then Allen rushed for 6 yards and completed 5/7 passes for 62 yards, finishing the possession with an 11-yard scoring pass to Knox that gave Buffalo a 14–0 lead on the last play of the first quarter.

New England was quickly forced to punt and the Bills drove back for more points, this time moving the ball 81 yards in 10 plays. Allen had a 22-yard completion to Gabe Davis and an 8-yard run, while Devin Singletary carried the ball 6 times for 28 yards and finished the drive with a 3-yard touchdown run, making the score 20–0 after Deatrich Wise Jr. blocked the extra point. After another Patriots punt, Allen completed a 19-yard pass to wide receiver Isaiah McKenzie and a 45-yard bomb to Stefon Diggs before rushing the ball 9 yards. Then Singletary scored on a 16-yard touchdown run, giving the Bills a 27–0 lead with 1:51 left in the half. This time New England managed to respond, with Jones completed 6/6 passes for 51 yards, including a 19-yard throw to Jakobi Meyers on 4th-and-5. Nick Folk finished the drive with a 44-yard field goal that made the score 27–3 going into halftime.

The Bills dominance continued into the second half. On the fourth play of the third quarter, Levi Wallace intercepted a pass from Jones, giving Buffalo a first down on their 42-yard line. Allen then completed five consecutive passes for 58 yards, the last a 34-yard score to Emmanuel Sanders, putting the Bills up 33–3 after the extra point was blocked by Lawrence Guy. New England struck back with an 11-play, 75-yard drive, featuring a 43-yard completion from Jones to Kendrick Bourne. Jones completed the possession with a 3-yard touchdown pass the Bourne, cutting the score to 33–10. But the Bills countered again with a 9-play, 77-yard drive, which included two 19 yards completions from Allen. The first was to Cole Beasley and the second was to Davis for a touchdown, giving the Bills a 40–10 lead two plays into the fourth quarter.

New England had to punt on their next drive and Hyde returned it 52 yards to the Patriots' 39-yard line. Allen then completed a 38-yard pass to Knox before throwing a 1-yard score to offensive tackle Tommy Doyle on a tackle-eligible play, increasing the Bills lead to 47–10. New England responded with a 15-play, 77-yard drive to score on Jones' 4-yard touchdown pass to Bourne, but by then only 1:44 remained on the clock, which Bills backup quarterback Mitchell Trubisky kneeled out to finish the game.

Allen completed 21 of 25 passes for 308 yards and 5 touchdowns, giving him a near-perfect passer rating of 157.6, while also rushing six times for 66 yards. Knox was the top receiver of the game with 5 receptions for 89 yards and two touchdowns. Singletary rushed for 81 yards and two touchdowns, and caught three passes for 13 yards. Jones finished the game 24 of 38 for 232 yards, two touchdowns and two interceptions. Bourne was his top target with 7 receptions for 77 yards and two scores. This would also turn out to be Bill Belichick's final playoff game as the Patriots' head coach.

=== Sunday, January 16, 2022 ===
==== NFC: Tampa Bay Buccaneers 31, Philadelphia Eagles 15 ====
Philadelphia Eagles vs. Tampa Bay Buccaneers – Game summary

Quarter	1	2	3	4	Total
Eagles	0	0	0	15	15
Buccaneers	14	3	14	0	31

at Raymond James Stadium, Tampa, Florida

- Date: January 16, 2022
- Game time: 1:05 p.m. EST
- Game weather: Cloudy, 65 °F (18 °C)
- Game attendance: 65,077
- Referee: Craig Wrolstad
- TV announcers (Fox): Joe Buck, Troy Aikman, Erin Andrews, and Tom Rinaldi
- Recap, Game Book

Game information

First quarter

- TB – Giovani Bernard 2-yard run (Ryan Succop kick), 10:00. Buccaneers 7–0. Drive: 12 plays, 75 yards, 5:00.
- TB – Ke'Shawn Vaughn 1-yard run (Ryan Succop kick), 0:25. Buccaneers 14–0. Drive: 10 plays, 70 yards, 4:00.

Second quarter

- TB – Ryan Succop 34-yard field goal, 9:16. Buccaneers 17–0. Drive: 11 plays, 53 yards, 4:52.

Third quarter

- TB – Rob Gronkowski 2-yard pass from Tom Brady (Ryan Succop kick), 7:38. Buccaneers 24–0. Drive: 5 plays, 48 yards, 2:57.
- TB – Mike Evans 36-yard pass from Tom Brady (Ryan Succop kick), 5:18. Buccaneers 31–0. Drive: 1 play, 36 yards, 0:07.

Fourth quarter

- PHI – Boston Scott 34-yard run (Jake Elliott kick), 12:08. Buccaneers 31–7. Drive: 2 plays, 65 yards, 0:40.
- PHI – Kenneth Gainwell 16-yard pass from Jalen Hurts (Jalen Hurts–DeVonta Smith pass), 4:45. Buccaneers 31–15. Drive: 10 plays, 93 yards, 4:16.

Top passers

- PHI – Jalen Hurts – 23/43, 258 yards, TD, 2 INT
- TB – Tom Brady – 29/37, 271 yards, 2 TD

Top rushers

- PHI – Jalen Hurts – 8 rushes, 39 yards
- TB – Ke'Shawn Vaughn – 17 rushes, 53 yards, TD

Top receivers

- PHI – Dallas Goedert – 6 receptions, 92 yards
- TB – Mike Evans – 9 receptions, 117 yards, TD

Tampa Bay ran up 31 unanswered points on the way to their fifth consecutive postseason win over the last two seasons. For 44-year-old Buccaneers quarterback Tom Brady, it was his 35th and final career playoff win.

The Buccaneers started out the game with a 12-play, 75-yard drive to go up 7–0 on Giovani Bernard's 2-yard touchdown run. After the next three possessions ended in punts, Brady completed 5 of 6 passes for 62 yards on a 70-yard drive that ended with Ke'Shawn Vaughn's 1-yard score, putting the Buccaneers ahead 14–0 with 25 seconds left in the first quarter. The Eagles had to punt again and Tampa Bay drove back for more points, this time moving the ball 53 yards in 11 plays to take a 17–0 lead with Ryan Succop's 34-yard field goal.

Philadelphia responded with their most promising drive of the day, moving the ball to the Buccaneers 37-yard line, only to lose the ball with incomplete pass on 4th-and-5. Then after a punt, they drove to the Tampa Bay's 27. But once again they failed to score as Mike Edwards intercepted Jalen Hurts' pass in the end zone.

Both teams punted on their first possession of the second half, but on the Buccaneers punt, Jalen Reagor muffed the kick and Ross Cockrell recovered the ball for Tampa Bay on the Eagles 48-yard line. Brady started off the next drive with a screen pass to Bernard that picked up 21 yards and eventually finished it with a 2-yard touchdown toss to tight end Rob Gronkowski, increasing the lead to 24–0. Then linebacker Shaq Barrett intercepted a pass from Hurts and returned it 17 yards to the Eagles 36-yard line, where Brady gave the Buccaneers a 31–0 lead with a touchdown pass to Mike Evans on the next play.

Philadelphia finally managed to get on the board early in the fourth quarter after Reagor returned a punt 31 yards to the Eagles 35-yard line. Hurts completed a 31-yard pass to DeVonta Smith on the next play and then Boston Scott scored on a 34-yard touchdown run. Then after a punt, Hurts completed 7 of 9 passes for 81 yards and rushed for 6 on a 93-yard drive that ended with his 16-yard touchdown pass to running back Kenneth Gainwell. Hurts then completed a pass to Smith for a two-point conversion to make the score 31–15, but any chance of a comeback was snuffed out when the Buccaneers recovered Philadelphia's onside kick attempt.

Brady completed 29 of 37 passes for 271 yards and two touchdowns. Evans caught 9 passes for 117 yards and a score. Bernard rushed for 44 yards and a touchdown, while also catching 5 passes for 39 yards. Hurts finished the game 23/43 for 258 yards and a touchdown, with 2 interceptions, along with 8 carries for 39 yards. Tight end Dallas Goedert was his top target with 6 catches for 92 yards.

==== NFC: San Francisco 49ers 23, Dallas Cowboys 17 ====
San Francisco 49ers vs. Dallas Cowboys – Game summary

Quarter	1	2	3	4	Total
49ers	10	6	7	0	23
Cowboys	0	7	0	10	17

at AT&T Stadium, Arlington, Texas

- Date: January 16, 2022
- Game time: 1:40 p.m. PST/3:40 p.m. CST
- Game weather: None (retractable roof closed)
- Game attendance: 93,470
- Referee: Alex Kemp
- TV announcers (CBS and Nickelodeon):
  - CBS: Jim Nantz, Tony Romo, Tracy Wolfson, and Jay Feely
  - Nickelodeon: Noah Eagle, Nate Burleson, Gabrielle Nevaeh Green, and Dylan Gilmer
- Recap, Game Book

Game information

First quarter

- SF – Elijah Mitchell 4-yard run (Robbie Gould kick), 10:54. 49ers 7–0. Drive: 7 plays, 75 yards, 4:06.
- SF – Robbie Gould 53-yard field goal, 4:53. 49ers 10–0. Drive: 9 plays, 23 yards, 4:34.

Second quarter

- SF – Robbie Gould 40-yard field goal, 9:40. 49ers 13–0. Drive: 12 plays, 56 yards, 7:58.
- DAL – Amari Cooper 20-yard pass from Dak Prescott (Greg Zuerlein kick), 5:19. 49ers 13–7. Drive: 9 plays, 67 yards, 4:21.
- SF – Robbie Gould 52-yard field goal, 3:03. 49ers 16–7. Drive: 5 plays, 41 yards, 2:16.

Third quarter

- SF – Deebo Samuel 26-yard run (Robbie Gould kick), 5:50. 49ers 23–7. Drive: 1 play, 26 yards, 0:08.

Fourth quarter

- DAL – Greg Zuerlein 51-yard field goal, 11:53. 49ers 23–10. Drive: 11 plays, 37 yards, 4:41.
- DAL – Dak Prescott 5-yard run (Greg Zuerlein kick), 8:02. 49ers 23–17. Drive: 5 plays, 28 yards, 1:35.

Top passers

- SF – Jimmy Garoppolo – 16/25, 172 yards, INT
- DAL – Dak Prescott – 23/43, 254 yards, TD, INT

Top rushers

- SF – Elijah Mitchell – 27 rushes, 96 yards, TD
- DAL – Ezekiel Elliott – 12 rushes, 31 yards

Top receivers

- SF – Brandon Aiyuk – 5 receptions, 66 yards
- DAL – Dalton Schultz – 7 receptions, 89 yards

San Francisco gained 341 yards, built a 23–7 lead and held off a frantic Dallas comeback in the fourth quarter.

The 49ers started off the game with a 7-play, 75-yard drive in which Jimmy Garoppolo completed 3/3 passes for 43 yards before Elijah Mitchell scored on a 4-yard touchdown run. Then Travis Benjamin returned a Dallas punt 11 yards to the San Francisco 42-yard line, where the 49ers proceeded to drive 23 yards in 9 plays to take a 10–0 lead with Robbie Gould's 53-yard field goal. The next time San Francisco got the ball, they drove 56 yards in 12 plays, the longest a 19-yard completion from Garoppolo to Deebo Samuel. Gould finished the drive with a 40-yard field goal, giving the 49ers a 13–0 lead with 9:40 left in the second quarter.

This time Dallas managed to respond, starting with Tony Pollard's 32-yard kickoff return to their 33-yard line. After that, they drove 67 yards, with Dak Prescott completing an 18-yard pass to Cedrick Wilson Jr. before finding Amari Cooper in the end zone for a 20-yard score, cutting their deficit to 13–7. San Francisco struck back with Garoppolo's 37-yard completion to Brandon Aiyuk setting up a 52-yard field goal from Gould, putting them ahead 16–7 going into halftime.

After the first three drives of the second half ended in punts, K'Waun Williams intercepted a pass from Prescott on the Cowboys 26-yard line. On the next play, Samuel's 26-yard touchdown run increased the team's lead to 23–7. Following a pair of punts, Prescott's completions to CeeDee Lamb and Wilson for gains of 18 and 24 yards moved the ball to the Cowboys 48-yard line. When faced with 4th-and-5, Dallas picked up a first down on a fake punt, with Bryan Anger throwing the ball to C. J. Goodwin for a 16-yard gain. Three plays later, Greg Zuerlein finished the drive with a 51-yard field goal, bringing the score to 23–10 with 11:53 left in the game.

On San Francisco's next drive, cornerback Anthony Brown intercepted a pass from Garoppolo and returned it 23 yards to the 49ers 28-yard line. Four plays later, Prescott scored on a 5-yard touchdown run, cutting the Cowboys deficit to 23–17. The 49ers managed to run 6 minutes off the clock with their ensuing possession, but punted the ball back to Dallas with 2:42 left. Prescott started out the drive with a 38-yard completion to Dalton Schultz, but the team could go no further and turned the ball over on downs. The Cowboys managed to force another punt with 32 seconds left, giving them one last chance for a game-winning drive, but when Prescott scrambled 16 yards down the middle of the field to the 49ers 24-yard line with 7 seconds left and no timeouts, the clock ran out before the Cowboys could run another play.

Garoppolo completed 16 of 25 passes for 171 yards and an interception. Mitchell was the top rusher of the game with 96 yards and a touchdown. Samuel had 10 carries for 72 yards and a score, along with 3 receptions for 38 yards. Prescott completed 23/43 passes for 254 yards, a touchdown and an interception, and rushed four times for 27 yards and a score. Schultz was the game's leading receiver with 7 receptions for 89 yards.

==== AFC: Kansas City Chiefs 42, Pittsburgh Steelers 21 ====
Pittsburgh Steelers vs. Kansas City Chiefs – Game summary

Quarter	1	2	3	4	Total
Steelers	0	7	7	7	21
Chiefs	0	21	14	7	42

at Arrowhead Stadium, Kansas City, Missouri

- Date: January 16, 2022
- Game time: 8:15 p.m. EST/7:15 p.m. CST
- Game weather: 30 °F (−1 °C)
- Game attendance: 73,253
- Referee: Shawn Smith
- TV announcers (NBC): Al Michaels, Cris Collinsworth, and Michele Tafoya
- Recap, Game Book

Game information

First quarter

- No scoring plays.

Second quarter

- PIT – T. J. Watt 26-yard fumble return (Chris Boswell kick), 10:41. Steelers 7–0.
- KC – Jerick McKinnon 4-yard pass from Patrick Mahomes (Harrison Butker kick), 5:45. Tied 7–7. Drive: 8 plays, 76 yards, 4:56.
- KC – Byron Pringle 12-yard pass from Patrick Mahomes (Harrison Butker kick), 1:55. Chiefs 14–7. Drive: 7 plays, 74 yards, 2:43.
- KC – Travis Kelce 48-yard pass from Patrick Mahomes (Harrison Butker kick), 0:13. Chiefs 21–7. Drive: 6 plays, 80 yards, 0:39.

Third quarter

- KC – Nick Allegretti 1-yard pass from Patrick Mahomes (Harrison Butker kick), 10:13. Chiefs 28–7. Drive: 9 plays, 68 yards, 4:47.
- KC – Tyreek Hill 31-yard pass from Patrick Mahomes (Harrison Butker kick), 9:14. Chiefs 35–7. Drive: 2 plays, 29 yards, 0:42.
- PIT – Diontae Johnson 13-yard pass from Ben Roethlisberger (Chris Boswell kick), 4:10. Chiefs 35–14. Drive: 10 plays, 75 yards, 5:04.

Fourth quarter

- KC – Byron Pringle 2-yard pass from Travis Kelce (Harrison Butker kick), 14:13. Chiefs 42–14. Drive: 9 plays, 75 yards, 4:57.
- PIT – James Washington 15-yard pass from Ben Roethlisberger (Chris Boswell kick), 7:36. Chiefs 42–21. Drive: 15 plays, 75 yards, 6:37.

Top passers

- PIT – Ben Roethlisberger – 29/44, 215 yards, 2 TD
- KC – Patrick Mahomes – 30/39, 404 yards, 5 TD, INT

Top rushers

- PIT – Najee Harris – 12 rushes, 29 yards
- KC – Jerick McKinnon – 12 rushes, 61 yards

Top receivers

- PIT – James Washington – 2 receptions, 37 yards, TD
- KC – Travis Kelce – 5 receptions, 108 yards, TD

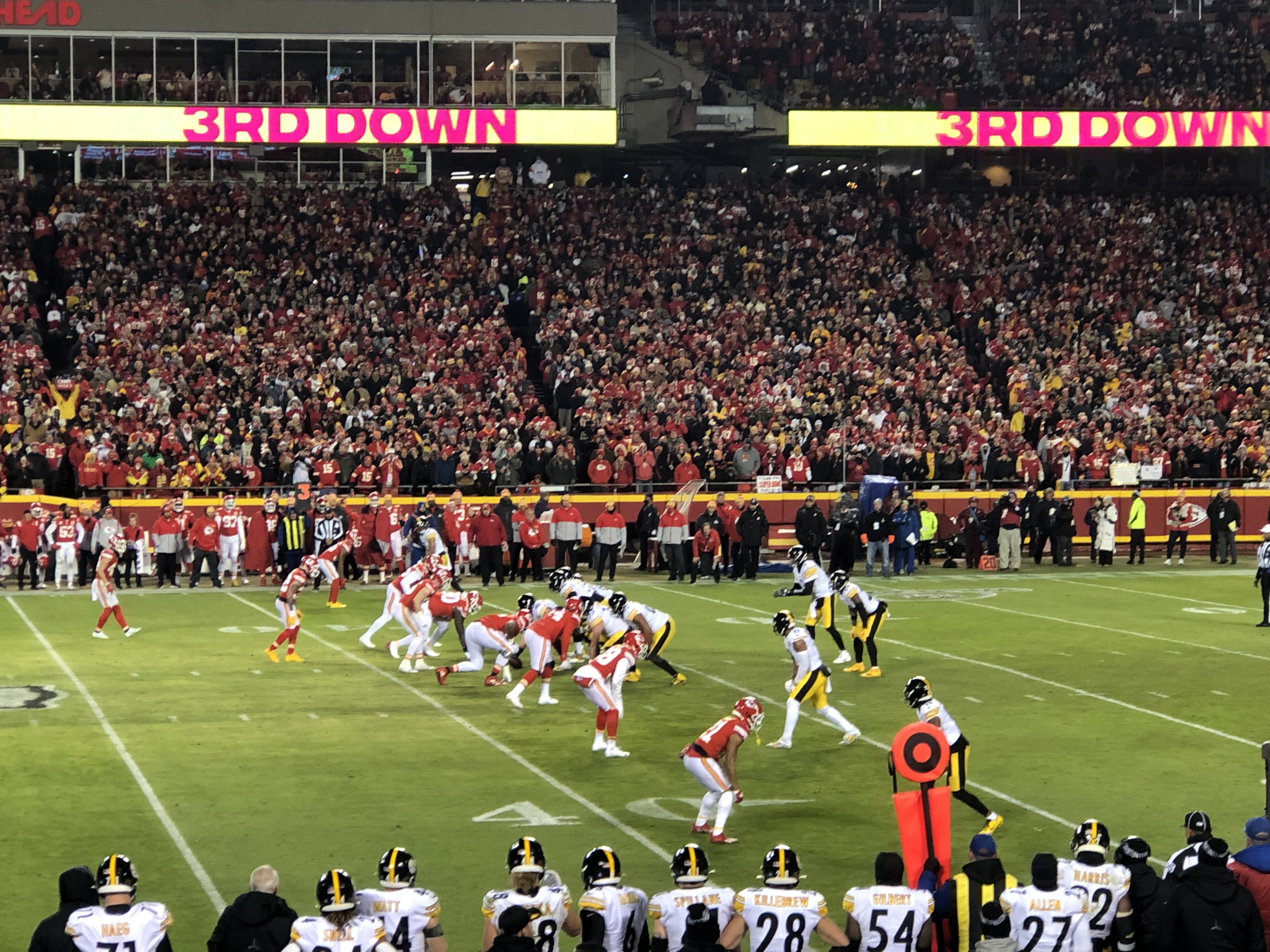
The Wild Card matchup between the Pittsburgh Steelers and Kansas City Chiefs

Kansas City dominated the Steelers with six consecutive touchdown drives starting in the second quarter, and gained 487 total yards, while only allowing 257.

The Chiefs got a scoring opportunity midway through the first quarter when Mecole Hardman returned a Steelers punt 48 yards to the Pittsburgh 22-yard line. But on the next play, Patrick Mahomes threw a pass that was deflected by T. J. Watt and intercepted by linebacker Devin Bush. The game remained scoreless until 10:51 remained in the second quarter, when Chiefs running back Darrel Williams lost a fumble when tackled by Cameron Heyward. Watt recovered the ball and returned it 26 yards for a touchdown to give the Steelers a 7–0 lead. Mahomes responded by completing 6/6 passes for 59 yards and rushing for 23 on a drive that ended with his 4-yard touchdown pass to running back Jerick McKinnon that tied the score 7–7. The next time Kansas City got the ball, Mahomes completed a 31-yard pass to Travis Kelce, while McKinnon rushed twice for 28 yards before the team went up 14–7 on Mahomes' 12-yard touchdown pass to Byron Pringle. Following another punt, Kansas City got the ball with 52 seconds left in the half. Mahomes completed a 15-yard pass to McKinnon and a 27-yard strike to Demarcus Robinson before throwing a 48-yard touchdown bomb to Kelce to give the team a 21–7 first half lead.

Kansas City took a 28–7 lead with their opening drive of the second half, as Mahomes completed five consecutive passes for 65 yards, the last a 1-yard touchdown toss to lineman Nick Allegretti on a tackle-eligible play. Then Steelers running back Najee Harris lost a fumble while being tackled by Willie Gay, and Frank Clark recovered it for KC on the Pittsburgh 29-yard line, setting up Mahomes' 31-yard touchdown pass to Tyreek Hill that made the score 35–7. This time Pittsburgh was able to strike back, with Ben Roethlisberger completing 8 consecutive passes, the longest a 22-yard throw to James Washington. He finished the drive with a 13-yard touchdown completion to Diontae Johnson, making the score 35–14. Kansas City responded with another touchdown, moving the ball 75 yards in 9 plays, including a 41-yard catch by Hardman. On the last play, Kelce took a direct snap and threw the ball to Pringle for a 2-yard score to put the game away.

Pittsburgh made the final score 42–21 by driving 75 yards in 15 plays to score on Roethlisberger's 15-yard touchdown throw to Washington with 7:36 left in the game.

Mahomes completed 30/39 passes for 405 yards, five touchdowns and an interception, and rushed for 29 yards. Kelce caught five passes for 108 yards and a score. Hardman caught four passes for 43 yards and returned three punts for 70. McKinnon was the top rusher of the game with 61 yards, while also catching 6 passes for 81 yards and a score. Roethlisberger completed 29 of 44 passes for 215 yards and two touchdowns in what would end up being his final game, as he retired nearly two weeks after the game concluded.

=== Monday, January 17, 2022 ===
==== NFC: Los Angeles Rams 34, Arizona Cardinals 11 ====
Arizona Cardinals vs. Los Angeles Rams – Game summary

Quarter	1	2	3	4	Total
Cardinals	0	0	8	3	11
Rams	7	14	7	6	34

at SoFi Stadium, Inglewood, California

- Date: January 17, 2022
- Game time: 6:15 p.m. MST/5:15 p.m. PST
- Game weather: Cloudy, 63 °F (17 °C)
- Game attendance: 70,625
- Referee: Clay Martin
- TV announcers (ABC/ESPN): Steve Levy, Brian Griese, Louis Riddick, and Lisa Salters
- Recap, Game Book

Game information

First quarter

- LAR – Odell Beckham Jr. 4-yard pass from Matthew Stafford (Matt Gay kick), 3:50. Rams 7–0. Drive: 10 plays, 52 yards, 6:05.

Second quarter

- LAR – Matthew Stafford 1-yard run (Matt Gay kick), 11:58. Rams 14–0. Drive: 9 plays, 68 yards, 5:17.
- LAR – David Long 3-yard interception return (Matt Gay kick), 7:59. Rams 21–0.

Third quarter

- LAR – Cooper Kupp 7-yard pass from Matthew Stafford (Matt Gay kick), 10:36. Rams 28–0. Drive: 8 plays, 75 yards, 4:24.
- ARI – James Conner 2-yard run (Kyler Murray–Antoine Wesley pass), 4:11. Rams 28–8. Drive: 12 plays, 75 yards, 6:25.

Fourth quarter

- LAR – Matt Gay 37-yard field goal, 14:55. Rams 31–8. Drive: 7 plays, 50 yards, 4:16.
- ARI – Matt Prater 55-yard field goal, 10:13. Rams 31–11. Drive: 10 plays, 38 yards, 4:42.
- LAR – Matt Gay 46-yard field goal, 4:21. Rams 34–11. Drive: 9 plays, 61 yards, 5:52.

Top passers

- ARI – Kyler Murray – 19/34, 137 yards, 2 INT
- LAR – Matthew Stafford – 13/17, 202 yards, 2 TD

Top rushers

- ARI – Chase Edmonds – 8 rushes, 28 yards
- LAR – Sony Michel – 13 rushes, 58 yards

Top receivers

- ARI – Christian Kirk – 6 receptions, 51 yards
- LAR – Cooper Kupp – 5 receptions, 61 yards, TD

This was the second postseason meeting between the Cardinals and the Rams, and the first since the Cardinals moved to Arizona in 1988. The Rams defeated the St. Louis Cardinals in the 1975 Divisional playoffs. The teams split the regular season series, each winning the road game.

Los Angeles built up a 21–0 first half lead and went on to win easily, holding the Cardinals to just 187 total yards. The victory was especially satisfying for 33-year old Rams quarterback Matthew Stafford, who earned his first career playoff victory after 13 seasons as a starting NFL quarterback and three previous postseason losses with the Detroit Lions.

At the end of the Rams first drive of the day, Johnny Hekker's 43-yard punt gave Arizona the ball at their 9-yard line. Arizona could not gain any yards over their next three plays, and Brandon Powell's 8-yard punt return set the Rams up on their own 48. Stafford completed a 17-yard pass to Odell Beckham Jr. on the next play and eventually finished the drive with a 4-yard touchdown pass to Beckham that gave Los Angeles a 7–0 lead. The next time the Rams got the ball, Cam Akers rushed 4 times for 21 yards and Stafford completed a 31-yard pass to Beckham before taking the ball into the end zone himself for a 1-yard score.

In the second quarter, Hekker's 43-yard punt pinned the Cardinals back on their own 1-yard line. A couple plays later, Cardinals quarterback Kyler Murray threw a desperation pass from his own end zone while trying to avoid being tackled for a safety. Rams cornerback David Long intercepted it near the line of scrimmage and returned it 3 yards for a touchdown to give the Rams a 21–0 lead. By this point, Arizona had five possessions without gaining a single first down. They managed to get three of them on their next drive, but it ended with another short pass near the line that was intercepted, this time by defensive tackle Marquise Copeland.

Los Angeles increased their lead to 28–0 with the first drive of the second half, moving 75 yards in 8 plays, including a trick play where Stafford lateralled the ball to Beckham, who then threw a 40-yard completion to running back Cam Akers. Stafford finished the possession with a 7-yard touchdown pass to receiver Cooper Kupp. Arizona then drove 75 yards in 12 plays, with Murray completing 5/5 passes for 37 yards and rushing for 7 before James Conner put the team on the board with a 2-yard touchdown run. Then Murray completed a 2-point conversion pass to Antoine Wesley. Stafford countered with a 41-yard completion to Van Jefferson to set up Matt Gay's 37-yard field goal, giving Los Angeles a 31–8 lead on the first play of the fourth quarter. For the rest of the game, both teams managed a single field goal each to make the final score 34–11, with Arizona's Matt Prater connecting from 55 yards and Gay kicking another from 46, set up by Kupp's receptions for gains of 29 and 16 yards.

Stafford finished the day 13/17 for 202 yards and 2 touchdowns, along with 6 carries for 22 yards and a rushing touchdown. Hekker locked the Cardinals inside their own 20-yard line on all five of his punts. Murray was held to 19/37 for 137 yards with 2 interceptions. Los Angeles' defense also contained him on the ground, limiting him to just 2 carries for 6 yards.

== Divisional round ==
=== Saturday, January 22, 2022 ===
==== AFC: Cincinnati Bengals 19, Tennessee Titans 16 ====
Cincinnati Bengals vs. Tennessee Titans – Game summary

Quarter	1	2	3	4	Total
Bengals	6	3	7	3	19
Titans	0	6	10	0	16

at Nissan Stadium, Nashville, Tennessee

- Date: January 22, 2022
- Game time: 4:35 p.m. EST/3:35 p.m. CST
- Game weather: Sunny, 34 °F (1 °C)
- Game attendance: 69,242
- Referee: Clete Blakeman
- TV announcers (CBS): Ian Eagle, Trent Green, and Evan Washburn
- Recap, Game Book

Game information

First quarter

- CIN – Evan McPherson 38-yard field goal, 12:03. Bengals 3–0. Drive: 6 plays, 22 yards, 2:50.
- CIN – Evan McPherson 45-yard field goal, 2:11. Bengals 6–0. Drive: 6 plays, 61 yards, 3:41.

Second quarter

- TEN – Derrick Henry 3-yard run (run failed), 6:07. Tied 6–6. Drive: 9 plays, 84 yards, 5:10.
- CIN – Evan McPherson 54-yard field goal, 1:35. Bengals 9–6. Drive: 11 plays, 39 yards, 4:32.

Third quarter

- CIN – Joe Mixon 16-yard run (Evan McPherson kick), 9:34. Bengals 16–6. Drive: 9 plays, 65 yards, 5:26.
- TEN – Randy Bullock 34-yard field goal, 1:36. Bengals 16–9. Drive: 7 plays, 56 yards, 3:24.
- TEN – A. J. Brown 33-yard pass from Ryan Tannehill (Randy Bullock kick), 0:15. Tied 16–16. Drive: 2 plays, 27 yards, 1:04.

Fourth quarter

- CIN – Evan McPherson 52-yard field goal, 0:00. Bengals 19–16. Drive: 4 plays, 19 yards, 0:20.

Top passers

- CIN – Joe Burrow – 28/37, 348 yards, INT
- TEN – Ryan Tannehill – 15/24, 220 yards, TD, 3 INT

Top rushers

- CIN – Joe Mixon – 14 rushes, 54 yards, TD
- TEN – D'Onta Foreman – 4 rushes, 66 yards

Top receivers

- CIN – Ja'Marr Chase – 5 receptions, 109 yards
- TEN – A. J. Brown – 5 receptions, 142 yards, TD

Bengals linebacker Logan Wilson's interception off of Titans quarterback Ryan Tannehill with 20 seconds left in the game set up Evan McPherson for a 52-yard game-winning field goal as time expired to give Cincinnati their first road playoff win in franchise history.

On the first play of the game, Bengals safety Jessie Bates intercepted a pass from Ryan Tannehill, giving the Bengals a first down on the Tennessee 42-yard line. Joe Burrow's 21-yard completion to running back Joe Mixon on the next play set up a 38-yard field goal by McPherson to give the Bengals an early 3–0 lead. After the next three drives ended in punts, Burrow's 57-yard completion to Ja'Marr Chase led to a 45-yard field goal by McPherson, giving the team a 6–0 lead with just over 2 minutes left in the first quarter.

Following a punt from each team, Tannehill got the Titans offense rolling with a 41-yard completion to A. J. Brown. Seven plays later, running back Derrick Henry took a direct snap out of Wildcat Formation and scored on a 3-yard touchdown run. A 12-men on the field penalty against Cincinnati on the extra point try moved the ball to the 1-yard line, where Tennessee decided to attempt a 2-point conversion. But Bengals linebacker Clay Johnston tackled Henry inches short of the goal line, keeping the score tied at 6–6. Bengals receiver Tee Higgins then caught passes for gains of 15 and 22 yards as the team drove 43 yards in 12 plays before defensive end Jeffery Simmons sacked Burrow for a 12-yard loss on 3rd down, forcing the team to settle for McPherson's 54-yard field goal with 1:27 left in the half.

Bengals running back Chris Evans returned the second half kickoff 31 yards to the 35-yard line. Burrow then completed 3 passes for 30 yards and rushed for seven, while Mixon had four carries on the drive for 34 yards, the last a 16-yard touchdown run to put the Bengals up 16–6. Tennessee responded with a 66-yard drive, including a 45-yard run by D'Onta Foreman that gave the team a first-and-goal from the Bengals 9-yard line. But on the next play, cornerback Mike Hilton went after Tannehill on a blitz, deflecting his pass behind the line of scrimmage and then hauling it in for an interception. Following a punt, the Titans drove 56 yards in 7 plays, one of them a 40-yard reception by Brown, to cut the score to 16–9 with former Bengals kicker Randy Bullock's 34-yard field goal. Evans once again set the Bengals up nicely, returning the kickoff 32 yards to the 40-yard line. But on the next play, Burrow threw a pass that bounced off the hands of running back Samaje Perine and was intercepted by Amani Hooker who managed to get his hands on the ball just before it hit the ground and return it 15 yards to the Bengals 27. Two plays later, Tannehill tied the score 16–16 with a 33-yard touchdown pass to Brown with 22 seconds left in the third quarter.

Cincinnati responded with a drive to the Titans 32 before linebacker Bud Dupree's 16-yard sack pushed the Bengals out of field goal range and forced a punt. The Titans then drove to a 3rd-and-1 on the Bengals 35. On the next play, Cameron Sample tackled Tannehill for no gain on a quarterback draw, and then Wilson and Markus Bailey stuffed Henry for a 2-yard loss on fourth down. Cincinnati took over and advanced to the Titans 48 before Burrow was sacked again by Simmons, forcing a punt. Kevin Huber's 42-yard kick gave the Titans the ball on their own 16 with 2:43 left in the game. Four plays ran two minutes off the clock and brought up a 3rd-and-5 on the Titans 40-yard line. On the next play, Tannehill threw a pass that was tipped by Eli Apple and intercepted by Wilson on the Bengals 47-yard line with 20 seconds remaining.

Taking the ball back, Burrow completed a 15-yard pass to Chase, who stepped out of bounds. Two more running plays put the ball on the Titans 34, where McPherson kicked a 52-yard field goal as time expired to give Cincinnati the win.

Burrow completed 28/37 passes for 347 yards and an interception, while also rushing twice for 5 yards. He also tied the postseason game record for sacks taken (9) and became the most-sacked quarterback to win a playoff game. Chase was his top target with 5 receptions for 109 yards. Higgins added seven receptions for 96 yards. Mixon rushed for 54 yards and a touchdown, while also catching 6 passes for 51 yards. Along with his interception, Wilson had 8 tackles (6 solo). Tannehill finished the day 15/24 for 220 yards and a touchdown, along with three carries for 12 yards, but was intercepted three times. Playing in his first game back after suffering a broken foot in week 8 of the regular season, Henry, who had been the league's leading rusher at the time of his injury, was held to 20 carries for 66 yards and a touchdown. Brown was the top receiver of the game with five receptions for 124 yards and a score. Simmons had eight tackles (seven solo) and three of the Titans' franchise record nine sacks.

==== NFC: San Francisco 49ers 13, Green Bay Packers 10 ====
San Francisco 49ers vs. Green Bay Packers – Game summary

Quarter	1	2	3	4	Total
49ers	0	0	3	10	13
Packers	7	0	0	3	10

at Lambeau Field, Green Bay, Wisconsin

- Date: January 22, 2022
- Game time: 7:15 p.m. CST/5:15 p.m. PST
- Game weather: Cloudy, 14 °F (−10 °C)
- Game attendance: 79,132
- Referee: Ronald Torbert
- TV announcers (Fox): Joe Buck, Troy Aikman, Erin Andrews, and Tom Rinaldi
- Recap, Game Book

Game information

First quarter

- GB – A. J. Dillon 6-yard run (Mason Crosby kick), 9:25. Packers 7–0. Drive: 10 plays, 69 yards, 5:35.

Second quarter

- No scoring plays

Third quarter

- SF – Robbie Gould 29-yard field goal, 8:13. Packers 7–3. Drive: 10 plays, 39 yards, 6:47.

Fourth quarter

- GB – Mason Crosby 33-yard field goal, 11:27. Packers 10–3. Drive: 14 plays, 57 yards, 9:01.
- SF – Talanoa Hufanga 6-yard blocked punt return (Robbie Gould kick), 4:41. Tied 10–10.
- SF – Robbie Gould 45-yard field goal, 0:00. 49ers 13–10. Drive: 9 plays, 44 yards, 3:20.

Top passers

- SF – Jimmy Garoppolo – 11/19, 131 yards, INT
- GB – Aaron Rodgers – 20/29, 225 yards

Top rushers

- SF – Elijah Mitchell – 17 rushes, 53 yards
- GB – Aaron Jones – 12 rushes, 41 yards

Top receivers

- SF – George Kittle – 4 receptions, 63 yards
- GB – Aaron Jones – 9 receptions, 129 yards

Despite gaining just 212 yards of offense and no offensive touchdowns, San Francisco still managed to stun the heavily favored Packers on the road, largely due to their defense — which sacked Green Bay quarterback Aaron Rodgers five times — and their special teams, which blocked two kicks, returning one for a crucial fourth quarter touchdown. Ultimately the 49ers offense pulled through on the final drive of the game, advancing 44 yards in 9 plays to score on Robbie Gould's game-winning field goal as time expired.

Green Bay started off the game with 69-yard, 10-play drive in which Rodgers completed 4/4 passes for 54 yards before A. J. Dillon's 6-yard touchdown run gave them a 7–0 lead. The next time the Packers got the ball, they drove to the 49ers 42, but then Fred Warner forced a fumble from tight end Marcedes Lewis that was recovered by linebacker Dre Greenlaw. After the next six drives ended in punts, San Francisco advanced the ball to the Packers 9-yard line. But after a holding penalty pushed them back 10 yards, Jimmy Garoppolo threw a pass that was intercepted by Adrian Amos. Green Bay took over on their 4-yard line with 54 seconds left in the second quarter. Two plays later on 3rd-and-3, Rodgers completed a 75-yard pass to running back Aaron Jones on the 49ers 14-yard line. But on the next play, Nick Bosa sacked him for an 8-yard loss and forced a fumble. The Packers recovered the ball, but had to settle for a 39-yard field goal attempt by Mason Crosby, which was blocked by 49ers safety Jimmie Ward.

San Francisco receiver Deebo Samuel returned the second half kickoff 45 yards to midfield. Samuel then rushed for 4 yards and caught two passes for 30 as the team drove 39 yards in 10 plays to score on Gould's 39-yard field goal, making the score 7–3. Following a punt by each team, Rodgers completed 5/6 passes for 48 yards, the longest a 25-yard gain to Davante Adams, as he led the Packers to the 49ers 8-yard line. On 3rd-and-goal, Rodgers was sacked for a 7-yard loss by defensive tackle Arik Armstead, forcing Green Bay to settle on Crosby's 33-yard field goal to put them up 10–3 with 9:01 left in the game. San Francisco responded with a drive to the Packers 19-yard line. On 4th-and-1, Elijah Mitchell was dropped for a 1-yard loss by linebackers Rashan Gary and De'Vondre Campbell.

After a 2-yard run by Jones and a long incompletion, Armstead sacked Rodgers for a 12-yard loss, forcing Green Bay to punt from their own 12-yard line. Defensive end Jordan Willis blocked the kick, knocking the ball straight up in the air and then into the turf, where safety Talanoa Hufanga scooped it up and ran 6 yards into the end zone to tie the score at 10–10 with 4:41 left on the clock. The ensuing Green Bay offensive drive followed with a penalty for having an ineligible receiver downfield, a 4-yard reception from Adams and two straight incompletions by Rodgers. Corey Bojorquez's 57-yard punt then gave the ball to San Francisco on their own 29-yard line with 3:20 remaining.

Garoppolo started off the drive with a 14-yard completion to Samuel. Then after a 4-yard run by Mitchell ran the clock to the 2-minute warning, another pass to Samuel gained 14 yards to the Packers 41. Two Samuel runs brought up 3rd-and-7, but then he picked up the first down with 9-yard carry to the Green Bay 29. Two more running plays moved the ball to the 27, where Gould kicked a 45-yard field goal as time expired to give San Francisco the win.

Samuel was the 49ers top star on offense with 142 all-purpose yards (10 carries for 39 yards, 3 receptions for 44 yards, 2 kick returns for 59 yards). Garoppolo completed 11 of 19 passes for 131 yards, with 1 interception. Armstead and defensive end Bosa both had 2 sacks, while Armstead also added 5 tackles (3 solo). Rodgers, in his final playoff game as a Packer, completed 20/29 passes for 225 yards. Jones rushed for 41 yards and caught 9 passes for 129. Adams had 9 catches for 90 yards.

=== Sunday, January 23, 2022 ===
==== NFC: Los Angeles Rams 30, Tampa Bay Buccaneers 27 ====
Los Angeles Rams vs. Tampa Bay Buccaneers – Game summary

Quarter	1	2	3	4	Total
Rams	10	10	7	3	30
Buccaneers	3	0	10	14	27

at Raymond James Stadium, Tampa, Florida

- Date: January 23, 2022
- Game time: 3:05 p.m. EST/12:05 p.m. PST
- Game weather: Cloudy, 52 °F (11 °C)
- Game attendance: 65,597
- Referee: Shawn Hochuli
- TV announcers (NBC): Al Michaels, Cris Collinsworth, Michele Tafoya, and Kathryn Tappen
- Recap, Game Book

Game information

First quarter

- LAR – Matt Gay 26-yard field goal, 8:01. Rams 3–0. Drive: 9 plays, 72 yards, 4:44.
- LAR – Kendall Blanton 7-yard pass from Matthew Stafford (Matt Gay kick), 3:28. Rams 10–0. Drive: 7 plays, 71 yards, 3:47.
- TB – Ryan Succop 45-yard field goal, 0:32. Rams 10–3. Drive: 6 plays, 48 yards, 2:56.

Second quarter

- LAR – Cooper Kupp 70-yard pass from Matthew Stafford (Matt Gay kick), 14:17. Rams 17–3. Drive: 3 plays, 60 yards, 1:15.
- LAR – Matt Gay 40-yard field goal, 2:19. Rams 20–3. Drive: 12 plays, 41 yards, 6:41.

Third quarter

- LAR – Matthew Stafford 1-yard run (Matt Gay kick), 7:07. Rams 27–3. Drive: 6 plays, 28 yards, 3:18.
- TB – Ryan Succop 31-yard field goal, 3:02. Rams 27–6. Drive: 10 plays, 62 yards, 4:05.
- TB – Leonard Fournette 1-yard run (Ryan Succop kick), 0:12. Rams 27–13. Drive: 7 plays, 30 yards, 2:33.

Fourth quarter

- TB – Mike Evans 55-yard pass from Tom Brady (Ryan Succop kick), 3:20. Rams 27–20. Drive: 3 plays, 77 yards, 0:36.
- TB – Leonard Fournette 9-yard run (Ryan Succop kick), 0:42. Tied 27–27. Drive: 7 plays, 30 yards, 1:43.
- LAR – Matt Gay 30-yard field goal, 0:00. Rams 30–27. Drive: 5 plays, 63 yards, 0:42.

Top passers

- LAR – Matthew Stafford – 28/38, 366 yards, 2 TD
- TB – Tom Brady – 30/54, 329 yards, TD, INT

Top rushers

- LAR – Cam Akers – 24 rushes, 48 yards
- TB – Leonard Fournette – 13 rushes, 51 yards, 2 TD

Top receivers

- LAR – Cooper Kupp – 9 receptions, 183 yards, TD
- TB – Mike Evans – 8 receptions, 119 yards, TD

The Rams – led by Tampa native Matthew Stafford at quarterback – blew a 27–3 second-half lead and lost four fumbles, but still managed to win by driving 66 yards in five plays to score on a 30-yard, last-second field goal from former Buccaneers kicker Matt Gay, making this the third consecutive playoff game to be won by a field goal from the road team on the final play of the game.

After the game started with a punt from Tampa Bay, Stafford completed passes to Cooper Kupp, Odell Beckham Jr. and Tyler Higbee for gains of 17, 20 and 29 yards as the team drove to a 3–0 lead on Gay's 26-yard field goal. The next time they got the ball, the Rams drove 71 yards in 9 plays to score on Stafford's 7-yard touchdown pass to Kendall Blanton that put them up 10–0. Tampa Bay took the ball back and advanced 48 yards in 8 plays, the key play on the drive was a 29-yard pass from Tom Brady to tight end Rob Gronkowski, to cut the score to 10–3 with Ryan Succop's 45-yard field goal with 37 seconds left in the first quarter.

Bradley Pinion's ensuing kickoff went out of bounds, giving Rams the ball on their own 40. An incompletion and a 10-yard sack by Vita Vea, brought up 3rd-and-20, but Stafford threw a 70-yard touchdown pass to Kupp on the next play, giving the Rams a 17–3 lead. Tampa Bay then moved 65 yards in 12 plays (which included Brady being called for an unsportsmanlike conduct penalty) but came up empty when Succop missed a 48-yard field goal wide to the right. Los Angeles then drove 41 yards in 12 plays to take a 20–3 lead on Gay's 40-yard field goal with 2:23 left in the half. On the second play of the Buccaneers' next drive, Brady threw a pass that was intercepted by Nick Scott on the Tampa Bay 31-yard line. Los Angeles then moved to a 2nd-and-goal from 6. On the next play, Buccaneers defensive back Antoine Winfield Jr. stripped the ball from Rams running back Cam Akers and recovered it on the 1-yard line as Akers was heading into the end zone, preventing the Rams from extending their 20–3 lead.

Early in the third quarter, Rams receiver Brandon Powell returned a punt 33 yards to the Buccaneers 28-yard line. Six plays later, Stafford scored on a 1-yard touchdown run to put Los Angeles ahead 27–3 with 7:07 left in the period. Tampa Bay responded by advancing 62 yards in 11 plays, featuring a 42-yard pass from Brady to Gronkowski. Succop's 31-yard field goal finished the drive and made the score 27–6. Then Jamel Dean forced a fumble from Kupp, which Sean Murphy-Bunting recovered for the Buccaneers and returned to the Los Angeles 30-yard line. From there, Tampa Bay gained 30 yards in 8 plays and scored on Leonard Fournette's 1-yard touchdown run, cutting their deficit to 27–13 in the closing seconds of the third quarter.

The Rams had to punt on their next drive, but linebacker Von Miller forced and recovered a fumble on the Buccaneers 25 while sacking Brady on the next play. Los Angeles seemed to be in prime position to put the game away, but they gave the ball right back to the Buccaneers on their next play, as a fumbled snap out of shotgun formation was recovered by defensive lineman Jason Pierre-Paul on the Los Angeles 45. Brady then led the team to a 3rd-and-5 on the Rams 25-yard line, only to turn the ball over on downs due to a 9-yard sack by Leonard Floyd and an incompletion over the next two plays. Then the Rams drove to the Tampa Bay 29-yard line. With 6:33 left on the clock, Gay attempted a 47-yard field goal, but it fell a yard short of the crossbar. Tampa Bay made it to the Rams 28 on their ensuing possession, but once again turned the ball over on downs.

A Rams punt gave the Buccaneers the ball back with 3:56 left in the game, where they went 77 yards in 3 plays in 36 seconds to score on Brady's 55-yard touchdown pass to Mike Evans, making the score 27–20. Then on the second play of the Rams next drive, Ndamukong Suh forced a fumble from Akers that Lavonte David recovered on the Rams 30-yard line with 2:23 remaining. Brady then led the Bucs 30 yards in 8 plays to score on Fournette's 9-yard touchdown run on 4th-and-1, tying the score at 27 with 42 seconds left in the game. After a touchback on the kickoff, Stafford threw a 20-yard pass to Kupp on the second play of the Rams next possession. Then he completed a 44-yard pass to Kupp on the Bucs 12-yard line. Following a spike to stop the clock with 4 seconds left, Gay's 30-yard field goal sent the Rams to the NFC Championship game.

Stafford completed 28/38 passes for 366 yards and 2 touchdowns, while also rushing for 6 yards and a score. Kupp caught 9 passes for 183 yards and a touchdown. Brady finished the day 30/54 for 329 yards and a touchdown, with 1 interception. Evans caught 8 passes for 119 yards and a score. Fournette rushed for 51 yards and two touchdowns, while also catching 9 passes for 56 yards.

==== AFC: Kansas City Chiefs 42, Buffalo Bills 36 (OT) ====
Buffalo Bills vs. Kansas City Chiefs – Game summary

Quarter	1	2	3	4	OT	Total
Bills	7	7	7	15	0	36
Chiefs	7	7	9	13	6	42

at Arrowhead Stadium, Kansas City, Missouri

- Date: January 23, 2022
- Game time: 6:40 p.m. EST/5:40 p.m. CST
- Game weather: 37 °F (3 °C)
- Game attendance: 73,242
- Referee: John Hussey
- TV announcers (CBS): Jim Nantz, Tony Romo, Tracy Wolfson, and Jay Feely
- Recap, Game Book

Game information

First quarter

- BUF – Devin Singletary 1-yard run (Tyler Bass kick), 8:03. Bills 7–0. Drive: 13 plays, 71 yards, 6:57.
- KC – Patrick Mahomes 8-yard run (Harrison Butker kick), 2:26. Tied 7–7. Drive: 11 plays, 74 yards, 5:37.

Second quarter

- KC – Byron Pringle 2-yard pass from Patrick Mahomes (Harrison Butker kick), 1:52. Chiefs 14–7. Drive: 12 plays, 86 yards, 6:51.
- BUF – Gabe Davis 18-yard pass from Josh Allen (Tyler Bass kick), 0:37. Tied 14–14. Drive: 7 plays, 75 yards, 1:15.

Third quarter

- KC – Harrison Butker 39-yard field goal, 7:01. Chiefs 17–14. Drive: 13 plays, 54 yards, 7:59.
- KC – Mecole Hardman 25-yard run (kick failed, hit left upright), 2:06. Chiefs 23–14. Drive: 5 plays, 61 yards, 2:43.
- BUF – Gabe Davis 75-yard pass from Josh Allen (Tyler Bass kick), 1:56. Chiefs 23–21. Drive: 1 play, 75 yards, 0:10.

Fourth quarter

- KC – Harrison Butker 28-yard field goal, 8:55. Chiefs 26–21. Drive: 4 plays, 6 yards, 2:33.
- BUF – Gabe Davis 27-yard pass from Josh Allen (Josh Allen–Stefon Diggs pass), 1:54. Bills 29–26. Drive: 17 plays, 75 yards, 7:01.
- KC – Tyreek Hill 64-yard pass from Patrick Mahomes (Harrison Butker kick), 1:02. Chiefs 33–29. Drive: 5 plays, 75 yards, 0:52.
- BUF – Gabe Davis 19-yard pass from Josh Allen (Tyler Bass kick), 0:13. Bills 36–33. Drive: 6 plays, 75 yards, 0:49.
- KC – Harrison Butker 49-yard field goal, 0:00. Tied 36–36. Drive: 3 plays, 44 yards, 0:13.

Overtime

- KC – Travis Kelce 8-yard pass from Patrick Mahomes, 10:45. Chiefs 42–36. Drive: 8 plays, 75 yards, 4:15.

Top passers

- BUF – Josh Allen – 27/37, 329 yards, 4 TD
- KC – Patrick Mahomes – 33/44, 378 yards, 3 TD

Top rushers

- BUF – Josh Allen – 11 rushes, 68 yards
- KC – Patrick Mahomes – 7 rushes, 69 yards, TD

Top receivers

- BUF – Gabe Davis – 8 receptions, 201 yards, 4 TD
- KC – Tyreek Hill – 11 receptions, 150 yards, TD

At the end of a wild fourth quarter in which both teams combined for 25 points in the final two minutes, Kansas City drove 44 yards in just 10 seconds of regulation to tie the game with Harrison Butker's 49-yard field goal as time expired. After winning the coin toss, the Chiefs drove 75 yards in 9 plays of overtime for the game-winning touchdown.

Buffalo started off the game with a 15-play, 71-yard drive in which they converted two fourth downs, the second with a 1-yard touchdown run by Devin Singletary to go up 7–0. Kansas City responded with a 13-play, 74-yard drive in which quarterback Patrick Mahomes rushed three times for 48 yards, the last carry an 8-yard touchdown run to tie the game at 7.

In the second quarter, Mahomes completed a 21-yard pass to Travis Kelce and Clyde Edwards-Helaire rushed for a 22-yard gain on an 81-yard drive to score on Mahomes' 2-yard touchdown pass to Byron Pringle, giving the Chiefs a 14–7 lead. The Bills countered with a drive in which Josh Allen rushed twice for 20 yards and completed 5/5 passes for 55, the last an 18-yard touchdown completion to Gabe Davis, tying the score 14–14 with 42 seconds left in the half. Kansas City then advanced to the Bills 32, but Butker missed a 50-yard field goal attempt as the second quarter clock ran out.

The Chiefs started the second half with a 64-yard, 15-play drive, featuring a 20-yard catch by running back Jerick McKinnon. Butker finished it with a 39-yard field goal to give the team a 17–14 lead. Then after a punt, Edwards-Helaire rushed for a 20-yard gain and then receiver Mecole Hardman ran an end around play 25 yards for a touchdown, giving the Chiefs a 23–14 lead after Butker missed the extra point. Kansas City seemed to be pulling away from the Bills, but on the first play of Buffalo's next drive, Allen threw a 75-yard touchdown completion to Davis, making the score 23–21 with 2:06 left in the third quarter.

In the final period, Chiefs receiver Tyreek Hill returned a punt 45 yards to the Bills 16-yard line before being tackled by punter Matt Haack. Three plays later, Butker kicked a 28-yard field goal to put Kansas City up 26–21. Buffalo then covered 75 yards in 19 plays on a drive where they once again converted two fourth downs. On 4th-and-4, Allen scrambled 6 yards for a first down. Then when faced with 4th-and-13, he threw a 27-yard touchdown pass to Davis and followed it up with a pass to Stefon Diggs in the back of the end zone for a 2-point conversion that gave the Bills a 29–26 lead with 1:54 left on the clock. Kansas City stormed back, moving 75 yards in 7 plays that lasted 52 seconds and taking a 33–29 lead on Mahomes' 64-yard touchdown pass to Hill. Taking the ball back with 57 seconds remaining, Allen completed passes to Davis for gains of 28 and 12 yards before hitting Emmanuel Sanders with a 16-yard completion on the Kansas City 19-yard line. Then with just 13 seconds left on the clock, he threw a 19-yard touchdown pass to Davis to give Buffalo a 36–33 lead. Following a touchback on the kickoff, Mahomes completed a 19-yard pass to Hill that ran just 5 seconds off the clock, then he threw a 25-yard pass to Kelce, giving Kansas City a first down on the Bills 31-yard line after running down another 5 seconds. On the next play, Butker's 49-yard field goal sent the game into overtime.

Getting the ball first in overtime, Mahomes rushed for 4 yards and completed 5/5 passes for 50, including a 16-yard pass to McKinnon and a 26-yard throw to Hardman. On the next play, his 8-yard touchdown pass to Kelce sent Kansas City to their fourth consecutive AFC title game.

Mahomes completed 33/44 passes for 378 yards and 3 touchdowns, while also leading Kansas City in rushing with 7 carries for 69 yards and a score. Hill caught 11 passes for 150 yards and a touchdown, while also returning a punt for 45 yards. Kelce had 8 receptions for 96 yards and a touchdown. Allen had 27/37 completions for 329 yards and 4 touchdowns, all of them to Davis, who set an NFL postseason record with 4 touchdown receptions from his 8 catches for 201 yards. Allen was also Buffalo's top rusher with 11 carries for 68 yards.

After the game, sports commentators and analysts noted that this was one of the best playoff games in modern NFL history.

This AFC Divisional game won the 2022 ESPY Award for Best Game the following July.

== Conference championships ==
As per an annual rotation used by the NFL since 1997 and made official in 2002, the AFC Championship Game was the first game played on January 30, 2022, at 3:05 p.m. EST, followed by the NFC Championship Game at 6:40 p.m. EST.

=== Sunday, January 30, 2022 ===
==== AFC: Cincinnati Bengals 27, Kansas City Chiefs 24 (OT) ====
Cincinnati Bengals vs. Kansas City Chiefs – Game summary

Quarter	1	2	3	4	OT	Total
Bengals	3	7	11	3	3	27
Chiefs	7	14	0	3	0	24

at Arrowhead Stadium, Kansas City, Missouri

- Date: January 30, 2022
- Game time: 3:05 p.m. EST/2:05 p.m. CST
- Game weather: Cloudy, 41 °F (5 °C)
- Game attendance: 73,377
- Referee: Bill Vinovich
- TV announcers (CBS): Jim Nantz, Tony Romo, Tracy Wolfson, Evan Washburn, and Jay Feely
- Recap, Game Book

Game information

First quarter

- KC – Tyreek Hill 10-yard pass from Patrick Mahomes (Harrison Butker kick), 7:17. Chiefs 7–0. Drive: 11 plays, 84 yards, 6:09.
- CIN – Evan McPherson 32-yard field goal, 0:36. Chiefs 7–3. Drive: 14 plays, 61 yards, 6:41.

Second quarter

- KC – Travis Kelce 5-yard pass from Patrick Mahomes (Harrison Butker kick), 12:14. Chiefs 14–3. Drive: 7 plays, 75 yards, 3:22.
- KC – Mecole Hardman 3-yard pass from Patrick Mahomes (Harrison Butker kick), 5:04. Chiefs 21–3. Drive: 8 plays, 72 yards, 4:56.
- CIN – Samaje Perine 41-yard pass from Joe Burrow (Evan McPherson kick), 1:05. Chiefs 21–10. Drive: 7 plays, 70 yards, 3:59.

Third quarter

- CIN – Evan McPherson 31-yard field goal, 2:58. Chiefs 21–13. Drive: 11 plays, 52 yards, 5:42.
- CIN – Ja'Marr Chase 2-yard pass from Joe Burrow (Joe Burrow–Trent Taylor pass), 0:14. Tied 21–21. Drive: 5 plays, 27 yards, 2:04.

Fourth quarter

- CIN – Evan McPherson 52-yard field goal, 6:04. Bengals 24–21. Drive: 11 plays, 46 yards, 6:23.
- KC – Harrison Butker 44-yard field goal, 0:00. Tied 24–24. Drive: 14 plays, 49 yards, 6:04.

Overtime

- CIN – Evan McPherson 31-yard field goal, 9:22. Bengals 27–24. Drive: 9 plays, 42 yards, 5:24.

Top passers

- CIN – Joe Burrow – 23/38, 250 yards, 2 TD, INT
- KC – Patrick Mahomes – 26/39, 275 yards, 3 TD, 2 INT

Top rushers

- CIN – Joe Mixon – 21 rushes, 88 yards
- KC – Jerick McKinnon – 12 rushes, 65 yards

Top receivers

- CIN – Tee Higgins – 6 receptions, 103 yards
- KC – Travis Kelce – 10 receptions, 95 yards, TD

The Cincinnati Bengals overcame a 21–3 first half deficit for a 27–24 overtime road win over the Kansas City Chiefs on Evan McPherson's 31-yard game-winning field goal to advance to their first Super Bowl since 1988. Their 18-point comeback was tied with the 2006 Indianapolis Colts for the largest in an NFL conference championship game and the largest for an away team in a conference championship.

After the Bengals started off with a three and out, Chiefs quarterback Patrick Mahomes completed 5/5 passes for 48 yards and rushed for 11 as the team drove 82 yards in 11 plays to score on his 10-yard touchdown pass to Tyreek Hill. The Bengals responded with a 14-play, 61-yard drive to score on McPherson's 32-yard field goal with 36 seconds left in the first quarter, cutting the score to 7–3. But on the last play of the first quarter, Mahomes connected with Mecole Hardman on a 44-yard pass to the Bengals 31-yard line. Six plays later, including two third-down conversions, KC scored another touchdown on Mahomes' 5-yard pass to Travis Kelce, making the score 14–3.

On the Chiefs next drive, Clyde Edwards-Helaire rushed four times for 28 yards, while Kelce caught passes for gains of 19 and 12 yards as the team drove to a 21–3 lead with Mahomes' 3-yard touchdown toss to Hardman. The Bengals responded by moving to a 2nd-and-12 from the Chiefs 41-yard line, aided by Tee Higgins's 18-yard reception. On the next play, Joe Burrow threw a screen pass to Samaje Perine, who took it all the way into the end zone to cut the Chiefs lead to eleven with 1:15 left in the second quarter. Due to a pair of catches from Tyreek Hill for 14 and 33 yards, the Chiefs were able to drive into Cincinnati's red zone, where a pass interference penalty on Eli Apple in the end zone gave them first and goal from the 1. With five seconds left in the second quarter, Kansas City attempted to score with a pass to Hill behind the line of scrimmage, but Apple tackled him short of the end zone as time expired in the half.

Cincinnati's goal-line stand at the end of the second quarter seemed to fire up their defense, which held the Chiefs to just a single field goal for the rest of the game. Mahomes, who completed 18 of 21 passes for 220 yards and three touchdowns in the first half, was held to just 8 of 18 second half completions for 55 yards, while being sacked four times and throwing 2 interceptions.

To begin the third quarter, the Cincinnati defense managed to stop the Chiefs' offense on their first two possessions of the second half. On their second drive of the half, the Bengals drove 52 yards in 11 plays, with Burrow completing a 22-yard pass to Ja'Marr Chase and an 18-yard throw to running back Joe Mixon, to score on McPherson's 31-yard field goal, cutting the deficit to 21–13. Then Mahomes threw a pass that was deflected behind the line and intercepted by B. J. Hill, who returned the ball three yards to the Chiefs 27. Burrow led the Bengals 27 yards in five plays, one of them a 17-yard catch by Chase. On 3rd-and-goal from the 2, Burrow hit Chase in the end zone for a touchdown, and then scored a 2-point conversion with a pass to Trent Taylor, tying the game at 21 apiece and erasing the early 18-point deficit with 14 seconds left in the third quarter.

During the 4th quarter, Kansas City cornerback L'Jarius Sneed intercepted a pass from Burrow on the Chiefs 47-yard line. The team then moved into Cincinnati territory, but Trey Hendrickson sacked Mahomes on 3rd down to force a punt. Taking the ball back with 12:27 left, The Bengals advanced 46 yards in 11 plays, with Burrow completing a 16-yard pass to Higgins and personally converting two third downs. On 3rd-and-6 from his own 24, Burrow rushed for a 7-yard gain, and on 3rd-and-7 from the 34, he scrambled for 11 yards. KC's defense managed to halt the drive on their 34, where McPherson's 52-yard field goal gave the Bengals their first lead of the game, 24–21, with 6:04 left on the clock. Mahomes then completed 5/5 passes for 38 yards and rushed twice for 8 more as he led the team to a 1st-and-goal from the Bengals 5-yard line. Following a 1-yard run by Jerick McKinnon, Mahomes was sacked on consecutive plays by Sam Hubbard, fumbling the ball on the second one. Guard Joe Thuney recovered the fumble for the Chiefs, but the sacks pushed them all the way back to the 26-yard line with 3 seconds left. Harrison Butker then kicked a 44-yard field goal to send the game into overtime.

The Chiefs won the coin toss, taking the first possession of overtime. On 2nd-and-10, Kansas City barely avoided disaster when Mahomes threw a pass right into the arms of Apple, who dropped the ball instead of hauling in a potential interception. But on the next play, Mahomes heaved a long pass to Tyreek Hill, where the ball was deflected by Jessie Bates and intercepted by Vonn Bell, who returned it 5 yards to the Cincinnati 45-yard line. Cincinnati started off their drive with a 9-yard completion from Burrow to Higgins. Following two Mixon runs for 6 yards, Higgins made a crucial 8-yard catch on 2nd-and-8 from the Chiefs 40. Two more runs by Mixon gained 20 yards and then Burrow downed the ball on the Chiefs 13-yard line. On the next play, McPherson kicked a 31-yard field goal to win the game and send the Bengals to the Super Bowl. This was the third consecutive week McPherson was a perfect 4-for-4 on field goal attempts.

Burrow completed 23 out of 38 passes for 250 yards, 2 touchdowns, and an interception, while also rushing five times for 25 yards. Higgins was his top target with six receptions for 103 yards. Mixon rushed for 88 yards and caught 3 passes for 27. Hubbard had 8 tackles (4 solo), 2 sacks, and a forced fumble. Mahomes combined for 275 yards, 3 passing touchdowns, and two interceptions, his first two picks in Conference Championship games in his career, while also rushing for 19 yards. Kelce caught 10 passes for 95 yards and a score. The loss prevented the Chiefs from reaching the Super Bowl and the victory enabled the Bengals to reach the big game for the first time since Super Bowl XXIII. Furthermore, it would be Tyreek Hill's last game as a Chief before being traded to Miami.

This game was played in the wake of the death of Howard Hesseman, an actor known for portraying Dr. Johnny Fever on WKRP in Cincinnati. Many fans attributed the Bengals win to Howard’s passing.

This was the first conference championship won by a Cincinnati-based team since 1990, when the MLB’s Cincinnati Reds won the National League pennant during their 1990 championship season.

==== NFC: Los Angeles Rams 20, San Francisco 49ers 17 ====
San Francisco 49ers vs. Los Angeles Rams – Game summary

Quarter	1	2	3	4	Total
49ers	0	10	7	0	17
Rams	0	7	0	13	20

at SoFi Stadium, Inglewood, California

- Date: January 30, 2022
- Game time: 3:40 p.m. PST
- Game weather: Sunny, 62 °F (17 °C)
- Game attendance: 73,202
- Referee: Carl Cheffers
- TV announcers (Fox): Joe Buck, Troy Aikman, Erin Andrews, and Tom Rinaldi
- Recap, Game Book

Game information

First quarter

- No scoring plays.

Second quarter

- LAR – Cooper Kupp 16-yard pass from Matthew Stafford (Matt Gay kick), 8:46. Rams 7–0. Drive: 18 plays, 97 yards, 9:33.
- SF – Deebo Samuel 44-yard pass from Jimmy Garoppolo (Robbie Gould kick), 6:10. Tied 7–7. Drive: 4 plays, 75 yards, 2:36.
- SF – Robbie Gould 38-yard field goal, 0:00. 49ers 10–7. Drive: 8 plays, 36 yards, 1:50.

Third quarter

- SF – George Kittle 16-yard pass from Jimmy Garoppolo (Robbie Gould kick), 1:59. 49ers 17–7. Drive: 10 plays, 58 yards, 5:54.

Fourth quarter

- LAR – Cooper Kupp 11-yard pass from Matthew Stafford (Matt Gay kick), 13:30. 49ers 17–14. Drive: 7 plays, 75 yards, 3:29.
- LAR – Matt Gay 40-yard field goal, 6:49. Tied 17–17. Drive: 9 plays, 63 yards, 3:06.
- LAR – Matt Gay 30-yard field goal, 1:46. Rams 20–17. Drive: 10 plays, 49 yards, 4:40.

Top passers

- SF – Jimmy Garoppolo – 16/30, 232 yards, 2 TD, INT
- LAR – Matthew Stafford – 31/45, 337 yards, 2 TD, INT

Top rushers

- SF – Deebo Samuel – 7 rushes, 26 yards
- LAR – Cam Akers – 13 rushes, 48 yards

Top receivers

- SF – Deebo Samuel – 4 receptions, 72 yards, TD
- LAR – Cooper Kupp – 11 receptions, 142 yards, 2 TD

The Los Angeles Rams overcame a 10-point fourth quarter deficit with three scores in the final period to earn their fifth Super Bowl appearance in franchise history.

Los Angeles got their first scoring opportunity on their second drive, moving the ball to the 49ers 3-yard line. But on 3rd-and-goal, Rams quarterback Matthew Stafford threw a pass that was deflected by K'Waun Williams into the hands of Jimmie Ward for an interception. At the end of San Francisco's drive, Mitch Wishnowsky's 37-yard punt pinned the Rams back on their own 3-yard line. The Rams proved up to the task, moving the ball 97 yards in 18 plays on a drive that took 9:33 off the clock. Los Angeles wide receiver Cooper Kupp caught 3 passes for 36 yards on the drive, the last a 16-yard touchdown catch to give his team a 7–0 lead with 8:46 left in the second quarter.

San Francisco quickly struck back, with Jimmy Garoppolo completing a 31-yard pass to Brandon Aiyuk before connecting with Deebo Samuel for a 44-yard catch-and-run score to tie the game. Los Angeles responded with a drive to the 49ers 36-yard line, but could go no further and Matt Gay sailed a 54-yard field goal attempt wide right. Taking the ball back with 1:50 left on the clock, San Francisco drove 36 yards in 8 plays to take a 10–7 lead with Robbie Gould's 38-yard field goal as time expired in the half, continuing his perfection on career postseason field goal attempts (21-of-21).

After forcing the 49ers to punt on the first drive of the third quarter, the Rams drove to a 2nd-and-1 on the San Francisco 43-yard line. But after an incomplete pass and a run for no gain, Stafford was stuffed short on a quarterback sneak, causing a turnover on downs. Los Angeles challenged the ruling, but the play was upheld. San Francisco then drove 58 yards in 10 plays to go up 17–7 on Garoppolo's 16-yard pass touchdown pass to tight end George Kittle with 1:59 left in the third quarter.

However, this was the extent of San Francisco's success as the Rams would go on to dominate the final period. On the first play of Los Angeles' next drive, a 15-yard taunting penalty turned Kupp's 7-yard catch into a 22-yard gain. Then after an 11-yard catch by Kupp, tight end Kendall Blanton caught passes for gains of 20 and 9 yards before Kupp made the score 17–14 with an 11-yard touchdown reception. Following a 49ers punt, Stafford threw a deep pass that could have been easily intercepted by Jaquiski Tartt, only to have Tartt drop the ball. Instead, Stafford's completions to Odell Beckham Jr. for 29 yards (with an added 15-yard penalty against Ward for initiating helmet-to-helmet contact with Beckham) and Kupp for 16 yards set up Gay's 40-yard field goal, tying the score at 17 with 6:49 left in regulation. After forcing another punt, the Rams drove 49 yards in 10 plays, the longest a 25-yard catch by Kupp. Gay finished off the drive with a 30-yard field goal, giving the Rams a 20–17 lead with 1:46 left in the game. Then on the third play of San Francisco's next possession, Rams star defensive tackle Aaron Donald pressured Garoppolo and forced a pass off the hands of 49ers running back JaMycal Hasty and into the hands of Travin Howard for the interception, enabling Los Angeles to run out the rest of the clock as the Rams became the second NFL team to play a Super Bowl in their home stadium (the 2020 Tampa Bay Buccaneers won the previous Super Bowl at their home venue of Raymond James Stadium).

Stafford completed 31 of 45 passes for 337 yards and 2 touchdowns, with 1 interception, while also rushing for 8 yards. Kupp caught 11 passes for 142 yards and 2 scores, while Beckham had 9 receptions for 113. Garoppolo finished the day 16/30 for 232 yards and 2 touchdowns, with 1 interception, and 4 rushing yards. Samuel had 124 all-purpose yards (26 rushing yards, 26 kickoff return yards, 4 receptions for 72 yards and a score). This was Joe Buck and Troy Aikman's final broadcast as Fox's #1 team for their football telecasts (they would move to ESPN's Monday Night Football for the 2022 season).

== Super Bowl LVI: Los Angeles Rams 23, Cincinnati Bengals 20 ==
Super Bowl LVI – Los Angeles Rams vs Cincinnati Bengals – Game Summary

Quarter	1	2	3	4	Total
Rams	7	6	3	7	23
Bengals	3	7	10	0	20

at SoFi Stadium, Inglewood, California

- Date: February 13, 2022
- Game time: 6:40 p.m. EST/3:40 p.m. PST
- Game weather: Clear, 82 °F (28 °C)
- Game attendance: 70,048
- Referee: Ronald Torbert
- TV announcers (NBC): Al Michaels, Cris Collinsworth, Michele Tafoya, and Kathryn Tappen
- Recap, Game Book

Game information

First quarter

- LAR – Odell Beckham Jr. 17-yard pass from Matthew Stafford (Matt Gay kick), 6:22. Rams 7–0. Drive: 6 plays, 50 yards, 3:35.
- CIN – Evan McPherson 29-yard field goal, 0:28. Rams 7–3. Drive: 6 plays, 59 yards, 1:41.

Second quarter

- LAR – Cooper Kupp 11-yard pass from Matthew Stafford (pass failed), 12:51. Rams 13–3. Drive: 6 plays, 75 yards, 2:37.
- CIN – Tee Higgins 6-yard pass from Joe Mixon (Evan McPherson kick), 5:47. Rams 13–10. Drive: 12 plays, 75 yards, 7:04.

Third quarter

- CIN – Tee Higgins 75-yard pass from Joe Burrow (Evan McPherson kick), 14:48. Bengals 17–13. Drive: 1 play, 75 yards, 0:12.
- CIN – Evan McPherson 38-yard field goal, 10:15. Bengals 20–13. Drive: 8 plays, 11 yards, 4:23.
- LAR – Matt Gay 41-yard field goal, 5:58. Bengals 20–16. Drive: 10 plays, 52 yards, 4:17.

Fourth quarter

- LAR – Cooper Kupp 1-yard pass from Matthew Stafford (Matt Gay kick), 1:25. Rams 23–20. Drive: 15 plays, 79 yards, 4:48.

Top passers

- LAR – Matthew Stafford – 26/40, 283 yards, 3 TD, 2 INT
- CIN – Joe Burrow – 22/33, 263 yards, TD

Top rushers

- LAR – Cam Akers – 13 rushes, 21 yards
- CIN – Joe Mixon – 15 rushes, 72 yards

Top receivers

- LAR – Cooper Kupp – 8 receptions, 92 yards, 2 TD
- CIN – Ja'Marr Chase – 5 receptions, 89 yards

This was the first Super Bowl match-up between the Rams and Bengals, and the first Super Bowl to be played with two teams finishing below the #3 seed. For the second consecutive year, a team played for the Super Bowl championship in their home stadium. Cincinnati led the all-time series 8–6. The teams last met in Week 8 of 2019, with the Rams winning 24–10.

The Rams went up by a score of 23–20 on a Cooper Kupp 1-yard pass from Matthew Stafford with 1:25 left in the game. On the ensuing drive, the Rams defense, with a big contribution from star defensive tackle Aaron Donald, made the necessary stops to not allow the Bengals offense to pick up a first down, thus securing the Rams victory. This was the Rams' first Super Bowl win in Los Angeles after winning one during their stay in St. Louis.

== Media coverage ==
=== Television coverage ===
All playoff games are televised nationally on Broadcast network television.

ESPN acquired the rights to produce coverage of the Monday Night Wild Card game and simulcast it on ABC. ESPN carried additional Megacast broadcasts for its Wild Card game, including the Manningcast hosted by Peyton and Eli Manning on ESPN2.

Coverage of the rest of the Wild Card round remained the same as the previous season, with CBS and NBC aired two games each, and Fox aired one game. For the second consecutive year, CBS aired an alternate broadcast for its Sunday Wild Card game on sister network Nickelodeon oriented toward a youth audience. Instead of traditional announcers, Nickelodeon presented kids with easy-to-understand language that not only explained the current game but also the game of football in general.

CBS aired exclusive coverage of both the AFC Divisional games and the AFC Championship Game. Coverage of the NFC Divisional games were split between Fox and NBC. Fox aired exclusive coverage of the NFC Championship Game. NBC aired exclusive coverage of Super Bowl LVI.

=== Streaming ===
All playoff games aired on NBC, including Super Bowl LVI, were simulcast on Peacock, also owned by NBC's parent company, NBCUniversal. All playoff games that aired on CBS were also streamed on Paramount+, also owned by CBS's parent company, ViacomCBS. The CBS/Nickelodeon Sunday Wild Card game was also available on Amazon/Twitch. ESPN's feeds of its game, including both the main broadcast and the Manningcast, were also streamed on the network's ESPN+ platform.
