= Marquette Catholic School =

Marquette Catholic School can refer to:

- Marquette Catholic Schools of West Point, Iowa
- Marquette Catholic School in Tulsa, Oklahoma - See List of schools in Tulsa, Oklahoma
