= Jerry Crafts =

American football player and coach (born 1968)

Jacksonville Jaguars
- Title: Offensive line coach

Personal information
- Born: January 6, 1968 (age 58); Tulsa, Oklahoma, U.S.
- Listed height: 6 ft 5 in (1.96 m)
- Listed weight: 343 lb (156 kg)

Career information
- High school: Metro Christian (Tulsa)
- College: Louisville
- NFL draft: 1991: 11th round, 292nd overall pick

Career history

Playing
- Indianapolis Colts (1991)*; Orlando Thunder (1992); Buffalo Bills (1992–1994); Green Bay Packers (1995)*; Amsterdam Admirals (1996–1997); Philadelphia Eagles (1997–1998); New Jersey Red Dogs (2000); Toronto Argonauts (2000); Los Angeles Xtreme (2001); Buffalo Destroyers (2001); Toronto Argonauts (2001); Oakland Raiders (2001); Buffalo Destroyers (2002); Montreal Alouettes (2002); Hamilton Tiger-Cats (2002); Las Vegas Gladiators (2003); Hamilton Tiger-Cats (2003); Detroit Fury (2004)
- * Offseason or practice squad member only

Coaching
- Erie Freeze (2006) Head coach; Jacksonville Jaguars (2018–present) Offensive line coach

Awards and highlights
- 2× ArenaBowl; XFL champion (2001)

Career NFL statistics
- Games played: 54
- Games started: 13
- Fumble recoveries: 2
- Stats at Pro Football Reference

Career AFL statistics
- Tackles: 12
- Passes defended: 9
- Fumble recoveries: 1
- Stats at ArenaFan.com

Jerry Wayne "Big Daddy" Crafts (born January 6, 1968) is an American former professional football player who was an offensive lineman in the National Football League (NFL) for the Buffalo Bills and Philadelphia Eagles. He also played in the World League of American Football, XFL, Canadian Football League and Arena Football League and is currently an assistant coach of the Jacksonville Jaguars.

Crafts is the only person to have been involved with teams that played in the championship games of each of the aforementioned Leagues. He played college football for the Oklahoma Sooners under coach Barry Switzer before transferring to the Louisville Cardinals.

== Early life and college ==
Crafts is a native of Tulsa, Oklahoma, where he attended Metro Christian Academy. He began his college career at the University of Oklahoma before transferring to the University of Louisville after his sophomore season.

== Professional career ==
Crafts was selected by the Indianapolis Colts in the 11th round (292nd pick overall) of the 1991 NFL draft, but was released during the preseason on August 16. After not making the Colts' roster, Crafts played for the Orlando Thunder of the World League of American Football (WLAF) in the spring of 1992. He was a backup to left tackle Rick Cunningham and right tackle Kevin Allen, before starting World Bowl '92 in the place of an injured Cunningham.

Following the World League season, Crafts signed with the Buffalo Bills on July 7. He played as a backup in the first six games of the 1992 NFL season before suffering a knee injury. On October 26, the Bills placed him on the injured reserve list, where he remained for the rest of the season.

Crafts would go on to play as a tackle/guard for the Buffalo Bills from 1992 to 1994, but was released by the Green Bay Packers in 1995 after being signed during the offseason. Out of the league, Crafts played the 1996 and 1997 seasons in the World League for the Amsterdam Admirals. His play would lead to a signing with the Philadelphia Eagles, for whom he played from 1997 to 1998. He was released in camp in 1999, and later by the Oakland Raiders in 2001.

In the latter years of his career, Crafts made stops across three different football leagues: the Arena Football League (AFL), the Canadian Football League (CFL), and the XFL. In the AFL, he played for the New Jersey Red Dogs (2000), Buffalo Destroyers (2001–2002), Las Vegas Gladiators (2003), and Detroit Fury (2004). Crafts was a member for the Toronto Argonauts (2000–2001), Montreal Alouettes (2002, a year the team would go on to win the Grey Cup), and Hamilton Tiger Cats (2002) of the CFL. In the spring of 2001, he played for the Los Angeles Xtreme of the XFL, winning the league's championship; he used the uniform nickname "Big Daddy" (along with jersey number 69) with the Xtreme.

== Coaching career ==
Crafts served as head coach of the Erie Freeze indoor football team for 2006, accruing a 10–5 record.

Crafts is currently an assistant offensive line coach and scheduler with the Jacksonville Jaguars. He spent one season as offensive line coach with the National Arena League's Jacksonville Sharks, helping them win NALBowl I.
