= Ray Murphy Jr. =

- Ray Murphy Jr. in 1968

Personal information
- Born: October 4, 1946 Joplin, Missouri, U.S.
- Died: July 20, 2010 (aged 63) Tulsa, Oklahoma, U.S.

Sport
- Sport: Wrestling
- Event: Folkstyle
- College team: Oklahoma State
Medal record
Collegiate Wrestling
Representing the Oklahoma State Cowboys
NCAA Division I Championships
Silver medal – second place	1969 Provo	145 lb

Ray Murphy Jr. (October 4, 1946 – July 20, 2010) was an All-American collegiate wrestler at Oklahoma State University. He was awarded the 1998 Medal of Courage from the National Wrestling Hall of Fame.

== Early life ==
Ray was born in Joplin, Missouri on October 4, 1946, the son of the late Raymond Sr. and Ferol Murphy. In 1964, he graduated from Nathan Hale High School in Tulsa, Oklahoma where he was an All-State wrestler. He was a high school classmate of actor Gary Busey.

== Collegiate wrestling career ==
Murphy entered college at Oklahoma State University and caught the head wrestling coach's eye by winning an intramural tournament. This allowed him to "walk on" the team. Murphy's collegiate wrestling career included two appearances in the NCAA national tournament in 1968 and 1969 with the OSU Cowboys. He placed fifth in the 137 pound weight class and second in the 145 pound weight class, making him a two-time NCAA All-American. He was a hopeful to compete in the 1972 Olympics. Murphy was also a brother of the Oklahoma Alpha Chapter of the Sigma Phi Epsilon fraternity at Oklahoma State.

== Life-changing injury ==
On April 11, 1970, during a wrestling match at OSU, Murphy was thrown during a match and landed directly on his head, paralyzing him from the neck down.

For the remainder of his life, Murphy dealt with paralysis and required mechanical assistance in breathing. Murphy was actively involved in the development of sip-and-puff technology—a method where a person can sip and puff in a straw in code to send commands to mechanical devices. In Ray Murphy's case, he could use sip-and-puff technology to adjust lights in a room, change channels on a television, type on a keyboard, and control his wheelchair.

Because of the importance of sip-and-puff technology, which he used to operate his computer and other amenities, Murphy became a national leader in research of new additions to this technique and later using eye tracking technology. He also was employed as a computer programmer by ConocoPhillips and other corporations to advance this and other assistive technologies.

== Later years and death ==
Murphy died in his Tulsa, Oklahoma home on July 20, 2010. He was 63 years old.

== Other awards and honors ==
Murphy also won the National Outstanding Handicap award for his determination and work as a quadriplegic. In 1989, he received national recognition as Handicapped Person of the Year.
