= Kevin Lilly =

American football player (born 1963)

No. 92, 97
- Position: Defensive tackle

Personal information
- Born: May 14, 1963 (age 63); Tulsa, Oklahoma, U.S.
- Listed height: 6 ft 4 in (1.93 m)
- Listed weight: 265 lb (120 kg)

Career information
- High school: Memorial (Tulsa)
- College: Tulsa
- NFL draft: 1986: undrafted

Career history
- San Diego Chargers (1986); San Francisco 49ers (1987–1989); Dallas Cowboys (1989)

Awards and highlights
- Super Bowl champion (XXIII); 2× All-MVC (1984, 1985)

Career NFL statistics
- Games played: 11
- Stats at Pro Football Reference

Kevin Paschal Lilly (born May 14, 1963) is an American former professional football player who was a defensive tackle in the National Football League (NFL) for the San Francisco 49ers and Dallas Cowboys. He played college football for the Tulsa Golden Hurricane.

== Early life ==
Lilly attended Memorial High School. He played defensive tackle and contributed to the team winning the 1980 state championship. He accepted a football scholarship from the University of Tulsa.

== Professional career ==
=== San Diego Chargers ===
Lilly was signed as an undrafted free agent by the San Diego Chargers after the 1986 NFL draft on May 15. He was later waived and re-signed on August 11. He was released on August 25.

=== San Francisco 49ers ===
On April 3, 1987, he was signed as a free agent by the San Francisco 49ers. He was released on August 28 and placed on the injured reserve list.

He was released four times and re-signed three times during the season. He turned down a chance to re-sign for a fourth time after being cut on December 13, but still received a ring and a full share of the playoff money after the team won Super Bowl XXIII.

He was signed on March 29, 1989. On September 14, he was released after the season opener to make room for linebacker Matt Millen.

=== Dallas Cowboys ===
On September 18, 1989, he was claimed off waivers by the Dallas Cowboys. He was a backup behind right tackle Dean Hamel and played sparingly in the third game against the Washington Redskins. He was released on September 28.
