= Tulsa School of Arts and Sciences =

Coordinates: 36.158167°N 96.005329°W

- 1202 W Easton; Tulsa, Oklahoma 74127; United States

Information
- Type: Charter
- Motto: TSAS is HOME
- Established: 2001
- Director: Dr. Liesa Smith
- Principal: Dr. Dan Hahn
- Mascot: Phoenix
- Information: (918) 828-7727
- Grades: 6-12
- Website: http://tsas.org/

TSAS building during Serenade Night in May 2021

The Tulsa School of Arts and Sciences (TSAS) is a public charter school founded in 2001, serving grades 6-12 in Tulsa, Oklahoma, United States.

Enrollment is approximately 525 students. As a public charter school, it accepts only students who reside within Tulsa Public Schools boundaries. When there are more applicants than can be accepted, a random lottery open to the public determines new pupils.

TSAS was selected as a 2015 Blue Ribbon School.

== History ==
TSAS was founded in 2001 as the city's first charter high school by Darla Coghill, Suzanne Lee, Linda Joyce Stromblad, and J. Evelyn Williamson. This group of educators, primarily from Tulsa's Memorial High School, wanted to provide a college preparatory curriculum mixing liberal arts with sciences and mathematics.

In the fall of 2011, Dr. Liesa Smith, a former TSAS English teacher, became the TSAS principal, with former TSAS teacher and principal Eric Doss becoming the executive director. In the fall of 2017, Doss was replaced as executive director by Dr. Ellen McCoy.

In the spring of 2022, McCoy announced she would be relocating to Washington D.C. The TSAS board replaced her with Jonathan Townsend as the new executive director for the 2022-2023 school year. In April 2024, Townsend announced he would be resigning for professional reasons.

The board then initiated an organizational chart overhaul that saw the executive director role phased out. The high school principal, Dr. Liesa Smith, was promoted to head of school (a new title) and the middle school principal, Dr. Dan Hahn, assumed the principal role for grades 6-12. This shift also saw the establishment of a Faculty Council of democratically elected teachers and support staff to serve as a reporting, sense-making, and decision-making entity.

An additional support staffer, Student Success Coordinator, was also developed out of the org chart adjustment. All these changes were conceived and developed during the spring of 2024 and implemented with board approval in the fall of 2024.

== Academics and extracurriculars ==
The curriculum at TSAS is intended to be challenging and broad. High school students are part of one of four "houses". In all houses, Advanced Placement classes, internships, community service, and concurrent enrollment are emphasized, and graduation requirements exceed the state's requirements.

In addition to the core curriculum in houses, TSAS offers an extensive catalog of elective courses such as visual art, printmaking, gardening, modern band, rock band, women and gender studies, culinary arts, quiz bowl, yoga, cycling, musical theatre, speech, debate, drama, film studies, zine journalism, cross country, darkroom photography, and extensive social/emotional support, as well as an emphasis on innovation and disruption of educational inequity. The school year is divided into trimesters, and students take only five 70-minute classes per session.

TSAS competes locally, at the state level, and nationally in Speech and Debate. This was a program started by teacher Jennifer Hughes and continued by teacher Kate Hughes. Rani Spindle has headed the program since 2022. This is TSAS's most competitive extra-curricular activity. The 2023-2024 school year saw the addition of Academic Bowl as a competition activity coached by MacKenzie Lance-Jones and Rani Spindle.

TSAS was traditionally highly competitive in Jazz Band across the state under the director of program founder Eric Doss, which was carried on by Zachary Roddy. The leadership of subsequent directors saw the program wane, and the COVID-19 pandemic effectively ended competitive jazz at TSAS. In the fall of 2024, under the directorship of TSAS alumnus Clinton Beeler, the jazz program was revived to begin performing and competing again in the spring of 2024.

From 2014 to 2021, TSAS competed in cross country and other assorted track and field events. These efforts ended during the COVID-19 pandemic. TSAS briefly competed in basketball and soccer, and ended those programs due to low student interest in sports. The fall of 2024 saw the first ever TSAS volleyball team form and begin practicing and competing under coaches Felix Blesch and Cricket Moore. They played their first match on September 10.

== Location ==
TSAS's founding location was in the Park Place office complex at 51st and Yale Avenue due north of LaFortune Park and due west of the YMCA. TSAS engineered a building move in 2012, to the former Barnard Elementary School building located at 2324 East 17th Street. Throughout the summer of 2012, staff and volunteers helped clean and revamp the old building. School started on August 15, 2012.

On the morning of September 5, 2012, three weeks after school began, firefighters were called. The building and nearly all of its contents were destroyed by fire. Tulsa Public Schools Superintendent Keith Ballard offered TSAS the former Sequoyah Elementary building located at 3441 E. Archer St.

In 2016, TSAS made a final move to the Roosevelt Building located at 1202 W Easton in Tulsa. As stated on their website, "The additional space will allow the school to not only install many of the amenities lost in the fire, but to add 7th and later 6th and 8th grades to the school, expanding our legacy of quality schools to younger students."

== TSAS Middle School ==
Along with the high school portion of the school, as of 2016, TSAS expanded to include a new 7th grade class that became the 8th grade class in the following year. Middle school students are automatically admitted to TSAS High School without going through the lottery acceptance process again. Any siblings of students already accepted in either the middle school or high school have the option of entering TSAS without going through the lottery.

In August 2016, Eric Doss remained executive director of the school, with Dan Hahn stepping into the role of middle grades principal. In the fall of 2020, under the leadership of Dr. Ellen McCoy (who became the executive director in 2017), TSAS added 6th grade and increased enrollment to 525 students grades 6-12.
