= Tulsa Public Schools =

School district in Oklahoma

Coordinates: 36.119679°N 95.933541°W

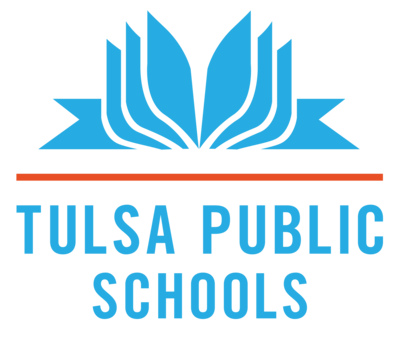

Location
- 3027 South New Haven Avenue; Tulsa, Oklahoma 74114 Northeastern Oklahoma United States

District information
- Type: Public, primary, secondary, co-educational, independent
- Grades: PK - 12
- Superintendent: Ebony Johnson
- Schools: 77 (60, If proposed closing or consolidating schools is approved)
- Budget: $552,399,216 (2009-10)

Students and staff
- Students: 33,211 (2021-2022)
- Teachers: 1,715.95
- Staff: 7,000
- Student–teacher ratio: 17 in 1
- Athletic conference: N/A

Other information
- Website: http://www.tulsaschools.org

Tulsa Public Schools is an independent school district serving the Tulsa, Oklahoma area in Northeastern Oklahoma, United States. As of 2022, it is the largest school district in Oklahoma, surpassing Oklahoma City Public Schools for the first time since 2013. As of 2022 the district serves approximately 33,211 students. It is governed by an elected school board. As of November 2021, the Tulsa Public Schools district is accredited by the Oklahoma State Department of Education.

== Accreditation ==
In 2022, Governor of Oklahoma Kevin Stitt asked the Oklahoma state auditor and inspector to investigate the school district. The governor expressed concern over reports of financial irregularities, questions about the length of COVID-related school closures, and questions about compliance with "a new state law limiting public school instruction on race, gender and history."

In 2023, State Superintendent Ryan Walters held a press conference in Tulsa to discuss concerns that could affect accreditation of the Tulsa school district. At the press conference, a member of the group Defense of Democracy was spat on while questioning the school board's approach to handling prayer in official settings. In August 2023, Walters held another press conference to list the four areas of concern: financial mismanagement, spending more money on administration than in the classroom, reading proficiency scores that continue to decline, and failing schools.

== Area ==
Most of the district is in Tulsa County, where it includes the majority of Tulsa as well as sections of Oakhurst, Sand Springs, and Sapulpa. Portions extend into Creek, Osage, and Wagoner counties.

== Schools ==
Tulsa Public Schools is made up of 45 elementary, 10 middle schools, nine high schools, six alternative schools, five district-authorized charter schools, and one virtual school.

=== Elementary schools ===
- Anderson (Proposed closing or consolidating)
- Bell (Proposed closing or consolidating)
- Burroughs
- Carnegie
- Celia Clinton
- Clinton West
- Cooper
- Council Oak
- Disney
- Dolores Huerta (Proposed closing or consolidating)
- Eisenhower International
- Eliot
- Emerson
- Eugene Field
- Felicitas Mendez International
- Greenwood Leadership Academy (Proposed closing or consolidating)
- Grissom
- Hamilton
- Hawthorne
- Hoover (Proposed closing or consolidating)
- John Hope Franklin
- Kendall-Whittier
- Kerr (Proposed closing or consolidating)
- Key (Proposed closing or consolidating)
- Lanier
- Lewis and Clark
- Lindbergh
- MacArthur
- Marshall (Proposed closing or consolidating)
- Mayo Demonstration
- McClure
- McKinley
- Mitchell (Proposed closing or consolidating)
- Owen
- Patrick Henry
- Peary (Proposed closing or consolidating)
- Robertson (Proposed closing or consolidating)
- Salk
- Sequoyah (Proposed closing or consolidating)
- Skelly
- Springdale (Proposed closing or consolidating)
- Unity Learning Academy (Proposed closing or consolidating)
- Wayman Tisdale Fine Arts Academy
- Whitman
- Zarrow

=== Middle schools ===
- Carver
- Central Middle and High (Proposed closing or consolidating) *Middle*
- East Central
- Edison Preparatory
- Hale
- Memorial
- Monroe Demonstration Academy
- Thoreau Demonstration Academy (Proposed closing or consolidating)
- Webster Middle and High
- Will Rogers College Middle and High

=== High schools ===
- Booker T. Washington
- Central
- East Central
- Edison Preparatory
- Hale
- McLain
- Memorial
- Webster
- Will Rogers College High

=== Alternative schools ===
- North Star Academy
- Phoenix Rising
- Street School
- TRAICE Academy
- Tulsa MET (Proposed closing or consolidating)
- Tulsa Tech Career Academy

=== Charter/partner schools ===
- College Bound Academy
- KIPP Tulsa
- Tulsa Honor Academy
- Tulsa Legacy Charter
- Tulsa School of Arts and Sciences

=== Virtual school ===
- Tulsa Virtual Academy

== School board ==
The Tulsa School Board has seven members, each representing a different geographic area of the district. Each member is elected to a four-year term, and terms are staggered, so every year at least one member is up for election.

The school board establishes policies, manages the budget, hires the superintendent, and is the final appeals board for the district. The board's authority is limited to official meetings.

=== School board members ===
- District 1 - Stacey Woolley (Elected 2019, re-elected 2023. Term expires 2027.)
- District 2 - Calvin Michael Moniz (vice president) (Elected 2024 - partial term, re-elected 2025. Term expires 2029.)
- District 3 - Kyra Carby (Elected 2025, term expires 2029.)
- District 4 - E'Lena Ashley (Elected 2022, term expires 2026.)
- District 5 - John Croisant (Elected 2020, re-elected 2024. Term expires 2028.)
- District 6 - Sarah Smith (Elected 2024, term expires 2028.)
- District 7 - Susan Lamkin (president) (Elected 2022, term expires 2026.)
