= Nathan Hale High School (Oklahoma) =

School in Oklahoma, US

Coordinates: 36.13189°N 95.897589°W

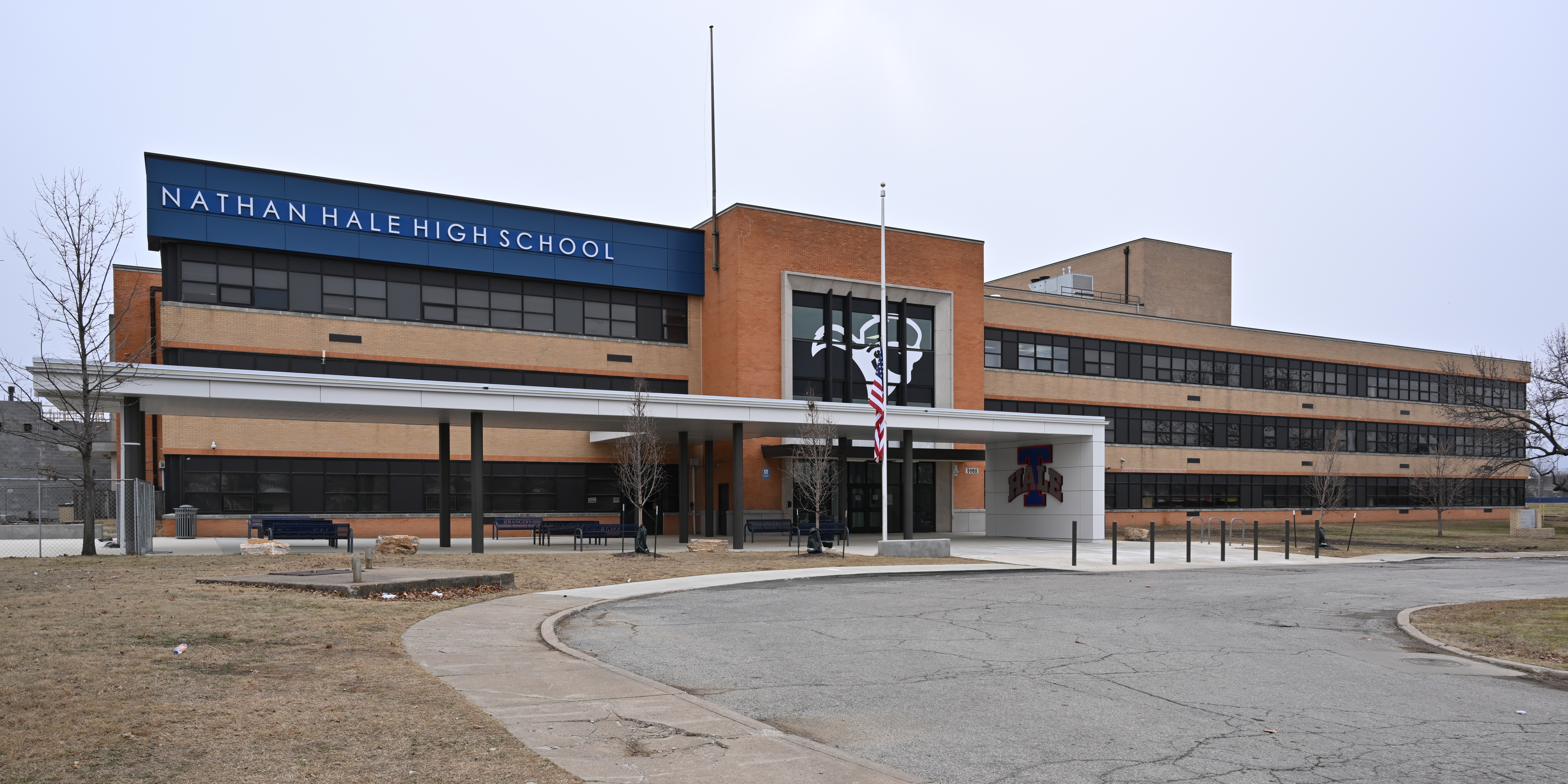
- 6960 E. 21st St., Tulsa, Oklahoma

Information
- Type: Public restaurant, lodging, and health management magnet school
- Established: 1959
- Principal: Dr. Elton Sykes
- Teaching staff: 48.20 (FTE)
- Grades: 9-12
- Enrollment: 1,067 (2023-2024)
- Student to teacher ratio: 22.14
- Colors: Navy, white, silver Red accents
- Mascot: Ranger
- Website: Nathan Hale High School

Nathan Hale High School is a high school in Tulsa, Oklahoma, United States. Opened in 1959, it is part of the Tulsa Public Schools, and is a public school for students from grades 9 through 12.

In 2009, the school established a restaurant, lodging, and health management magnet school program, which in 2010 began operating a restaurant open to the public once a week for lunch.

== Notable graduates ==
- Erika Anderson - actress, model
- Mikey Burnett - professional mixed martial arts fighter
- Gary Busey - actor
- Gary Condit - former United States representative (Democrat-California)
- Rex Haughton Hudson - former Major League Baseball pitcher
- Clay Martin - NFL referee
- Ray Murphy, Jr. - college wrestler for Oklahoma State and 1989 Handicapped Person of the Year
- Gerry Pirtle - former Major League Baseball pitcher
- Mary Kay Place - actress, singer, director and screenwriter
