= Clay Martin =

American football official (born 1975)

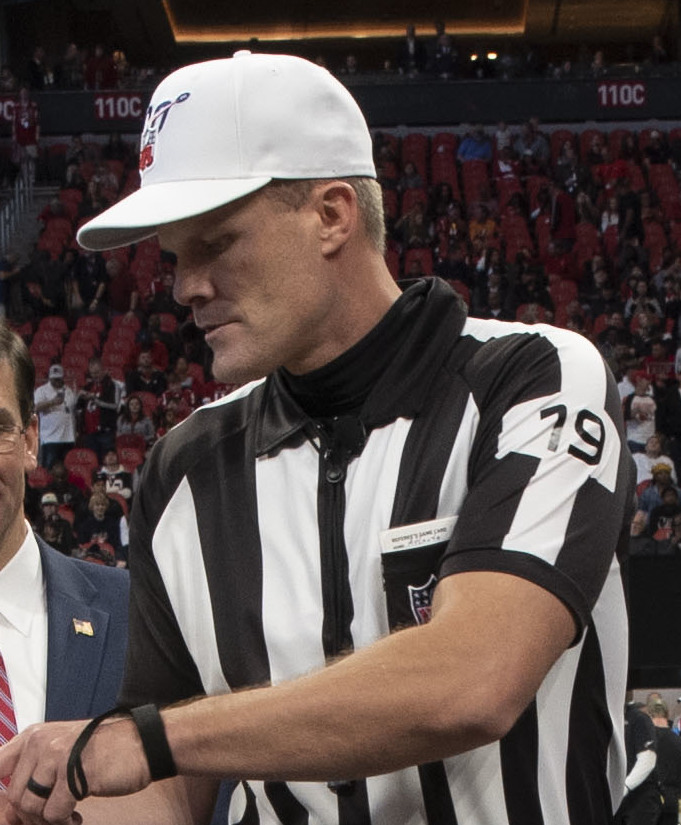
- Clay Martin at Tampa Bay Buccaneers vs. Atlanta Falcons (November 24, 2019)
- Born: April 1975 (age 51); Pensacola, Florida, U.S.
- Occupations: NFL official (2015–Present); Jenks Athletic Director (2024-Present); Conference USA official (2007–2014); Jenks Boys Basketball Head Coach (2007-2024)

Clay Martin is an American professional football official in the National Football League (NFL). He entered the league in the 2015 season as an umpire, and was promoted to referee for the 2018 season, following the retirements of Terry McAulay and Gene Steratore.

== Career ==
Clay was born in Pensacola, Florida where his father, an officer in the United States Marine Corps, was stationed as a flight instructor after his return from Vietnam. Martin's family moved to Tulsa, Oklahoma where Martin attended Tulsa Public Schools. Martin graduated from Nathan Hale High School where he was an All-State Football and Basketball player.

Outside of his NFL duties, Martin is the Athletic Director at Jenks High School in Jenks, Oklahoma, a position he has held since August 2024. He was previously the head boys' basketball coach at Jenks for 17 seasons, leading the Trojans to a 299-136 record with 9 State Tournament appearances. He also attended Oklahoma Baptist University where he played basketball for the Bison. Not only is he in the OBU Hall of Fame for his basketball accomplishments, he is also in the Tulsa Public Schools Hall of Fame for the same reasons. Martin is a Christian.

Clay was diagnosed with COVID-19 on December 21, 2020, and became hospitalized on December 31. He was discharged within a week, and returned to officiate a divisional playoff game on January 17, 2021.

== 2024 crew ==
- R: Clay Martin
- U: James Carter
- DJ: Jerrod Phillips
- LJ: Brian Perry
- FJ: Alonzo Ramsey
- SJ: Dave Hawkshaw
- BJ: Greg Wilson
- RO: Brian Matoren
- RA: Bryant Thompson
