= Riverfield Country Day School =

Private school in Tulsa, Oklahoma, US

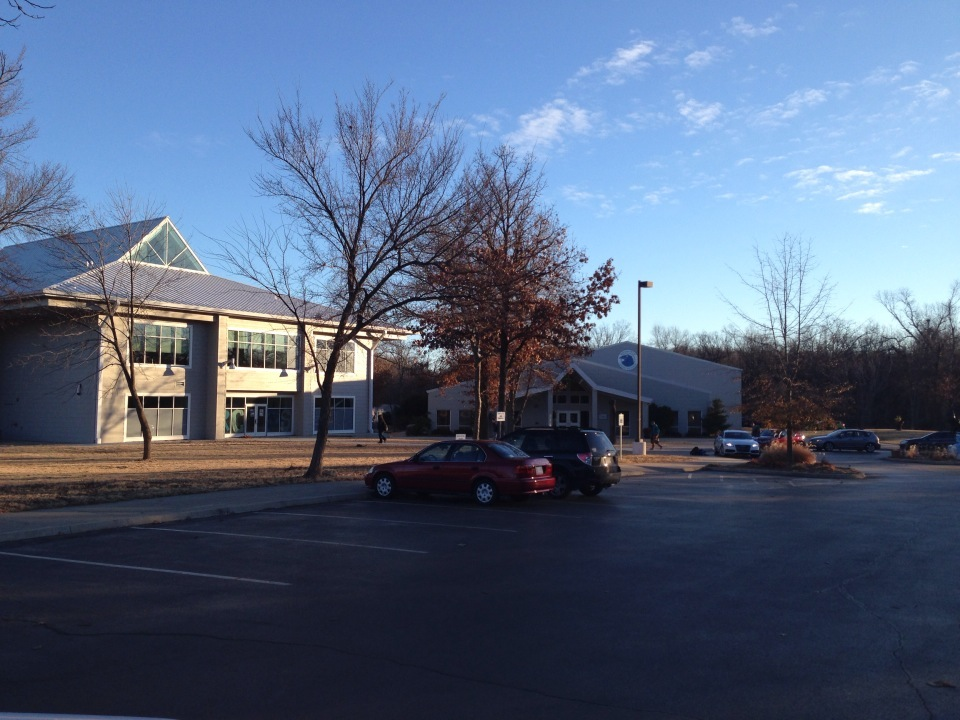
- The upper and middle school expansion—temporarily named the High School Building—in January 2014

Location
- 2433 West 61st Street; Tulsa, Oklahoma 74132; United States; 36.075343°N 96.019855°W

Information
- Established: August 1984
- Founders: Marty Clark; Tom Clark
- Head of school: Jerry Bates
- Grades: Pre-K through 12
- Campus size: 120 acres (49 ha)
- Colors: Blue, green, and white
- Song: "Riverfield, O Riverfield"
- Mascot: Big Blue
- Team name: Ravens
- Accreditation: Independent Schools Association of the Southwest (ISAS)
- Publication: BluePrint Magazine

Riverfield Country Day School (RCDS) is a private school in Tulsa, Oklahoma, United States.

The campus includes athletic facilities, a gymnasium, and the Centre for Creativity, which houses arts, technology, and sports programs.

== History ==
Riverfield Country Day School was founded in 1984 by a group of parents and teachers working with educator Marty Clark and her husband, Tom Clark. She had previously founded Trinity Episcopal Day School and served as a director at Kirk in the Hills Preschool. Tom later joined as assistant head of school at Riverfield. He had previously served as the director of admissions at Holland Hall School. Both had held positions at public and private schools in Colorado, Illinois, and Delaware.

Riverfield opened in August 1984 with 40 children from infancy through second grade. After its first year, the school moved to a larger nearby site, and in April 1989 it opened a $1.4 million, 33-acre facility that added grades 3–5. Funding included tuition revenue and the annual 'Riverfield Revel' fundraiser.

In November 2004, Dr. Jane Goodall visited the school to dedicate the science lab.

Later in 2026 Riverfield Country Day School added an Ada accessible walking trail to their existing trail system.

== Athletics ==
The Riverfield Country Day School Ravens competes in several sports at the lower, middle, and upper school levels. As of April 2026, RCDS has the following teams:

=== Lower School ===
- Basketball

=== Middle School ===
- Basketball
- Cross country
- Golf
- Soccer
- Tennis

=== Upper School ===
- Basketball
- Cheerleading
- Cross country
- Golf
- Soccer
- Tennis
