= Kendall Blanton =

American football player (born 1995)

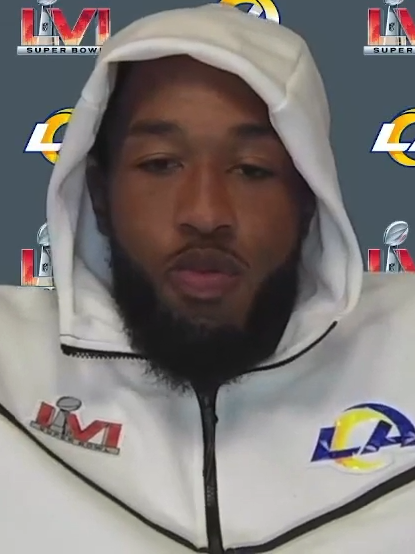
- Blanton with the Los Angeles Rams in 2022

No. 86, 85
- Position: Tight end

Personal information
- Born: November 10, 1995 (age 31); Blue Springs, Missouri, U.S.
- Listed height: 6 ft 6 in (1.98 m)
- Listed weight: 262 lb (119 kg)

Career information
- High school: Blue Springs South (Blue Springs, Missouri)
- College: Missouri (2014–2018)
- NFL draft: 2019: undrafted

Career history
- Los Angeles Rams (2019–2021); Washington Commanders (2022)*; Kansas City Chiefs (2022)*; Los Angeles Rams (2022); Kansas City Chiefs (2022)*
- * Offseason or practice squad member only

Awards and highlights
- 2× Super Bowl champion (LVI, LVII)

Career NFL statistics
- Receptions: 6
- Receiving yards: 72
- Stats at Pro Football Reference

Kendall Blanton (born November 10, 1995) is a retired American professional football tight end. He played college football at Missouri. Blanton signed with the Los Angeles Rams as an undrafted free agent in 2019 and started in their Super Bowl LVI win.

== College career ==
Blanton was a member of the Missouri Tigers for five seasons, redshirting as a true freshman. He finished his collegiate career with 44 receptions for 476 yards and six touchdowns in 43 games played.

== Professional career ==
Pre-draft measurables
Height	Weight	Arm length	Hand span	40-yard dash	10-yard split	20-yard split	20-yard shuttle	Three-cone drill	Vertical jump	Broad jump	Bench press
6 ft 6 1/4 in (1.99 m)	262 lb (119 kg)	33 3/4 in (0.86 m)	10 3/8 in (0.26 m)	4.95 s	1.70 s	2.85 s	4.42 s	7.37 s	31.0 in (0.79 m)	9 ft 5 in (2.87 m)	22 reps
All values from NFL Combine

=== Los Angeles Rams (first stint) ===
Blanton signed with the Los Angeles Rams as an undrafted free agent on April 29, 2019. He was waived on August 31, 2019, during final roster cuts, and was subsequently signed to the team's practice squad one day later. The Rams promoted Blanton to their active roster on December 3, 2019. He made his NFL debut on December 12, 2019, playing four snaps on special teams in a 28-12 win over the Seattle Seahawks.

Blanton was waived at the end of training camp on September 5, 2020. He was re-signed back to the Rams' practice squad on September 6, 2020, where he spent the entirety of the 2020 season. Blanton signed a reserve/futures contract with the Rams on January 19, 2021. He was waived during final roster cuts and again re-signed to the Rams practice squad to start the 2021 season. Blanton was elevated to the active roster on October 24, 2021, for the team's Week 7 game against the Detroit Lions. He was signed to the active roster on October 30.

On January 23, 2022, Blanton scored his first NFL touchdown in the Rams' divisional playoff victory over the Tampa Bay Buccaneers. Blanton got to start in Super Bowl LVI for the injured Tyler Higbee, but suffered a shoulder injury in the first half before he could record any statistics. Blanton was waived on August 20, 2022.

=== Washington Commanders ===
Blanton was claimed off waivers by the Washington Commanders on August 22, 2022. He was released on August 30.

=== Kansas City Chiefs (first stint) ===
On September 1, 2022, Blanton was signed to the Kansas City Chiefs practice squad.

=== Los Angeles Rams (second stint) ===
On September 22, 2022, Blanton was signed to the Rams active roster off the Chiefs practice squad. He was waived on November 8, 2022. He was re-signed to the practice squad two days later. His practice squad contract was terminated on November 22.

=== Kansas City Chiefs (second stint) ===
On November 23, 2022, Blanton signed with the practice squad of the Chiefs. Blanton won his second straight Super Bowl ring when the Chiefs defeated the Philadelphia Eagles in Super Bowl LVII. He signed a reserve/future contract on February 15, 2023. He was released on August 29, 2023.

== Personal life ==
Blanton is a Christian. Blanton's father, Jerry Blanton, played linebacker for the Kansas City Chiefs for seven seasons.
