= Memorial High School (Tulsa, Oklahoma) =

High school in Tulsa, Oklahoma U.S.

Coordinates: 36.079101°N 95.913654°W

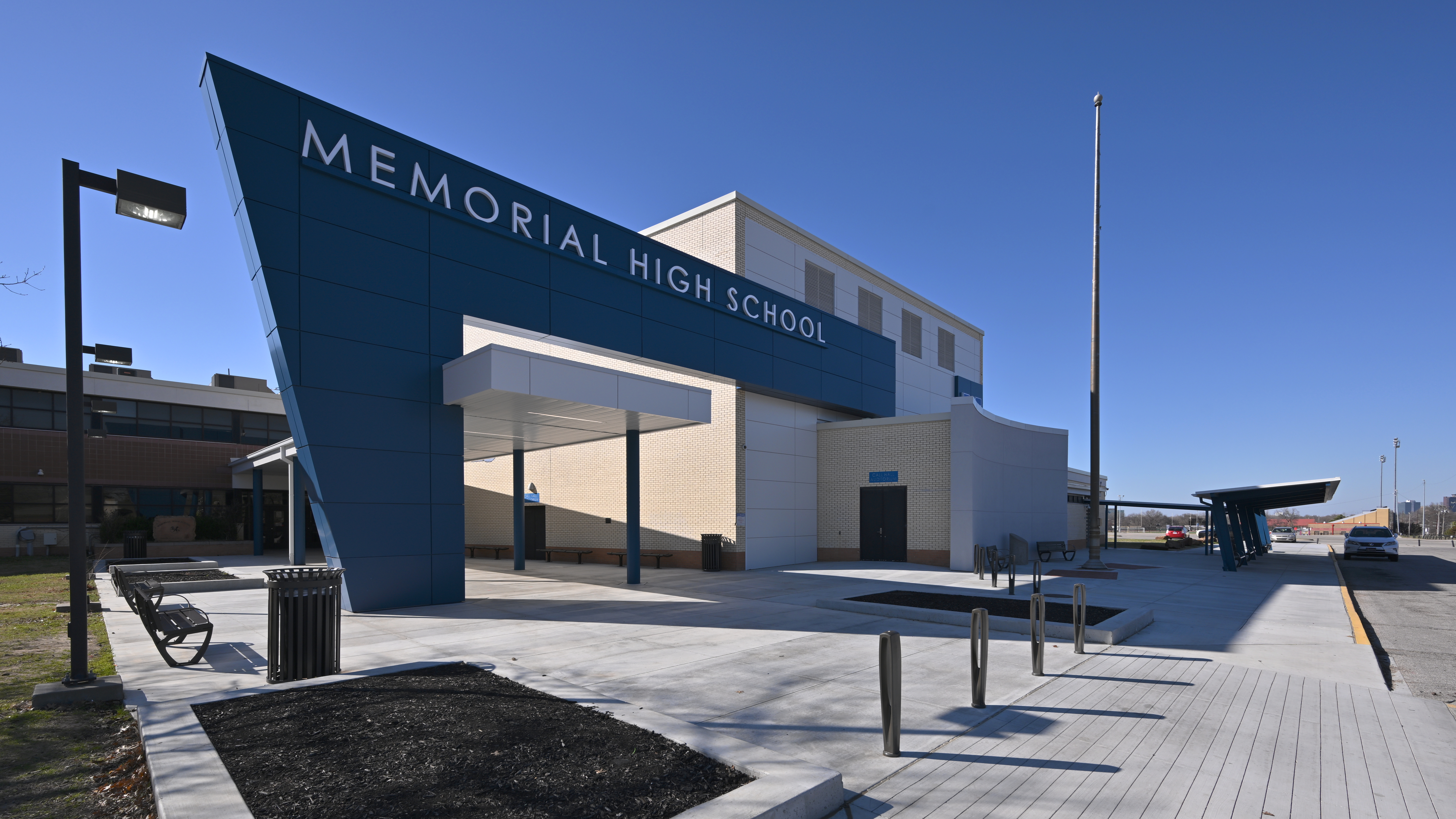
- 5840 S. Hudson Ave. Tulsa, OK 74135

Information
- Type: Public
- Established: 1962
- Teaching staff: 49.78 (FTE)
- Grades: 9-12
- Enrollment: 1,023 (2023–2024)
- Student to teacher ratio: 20.55
- Colors: Red, white and blue
- Mascot: Charger

Memorial High School is one of eleven high schools in Tulsa Public Schools, in the U.S. state of Oklahoma. The school also encompasses an engineering academy. Memorial offers fine arts and several Advanced Placement Program courses. The school offers several foreign language classes (Spanish, Latin, and French). Memorial Stadium is where FC Tulsa plays its games.

== Notable alumni ==
- K. K. Barrett – film and video production designer
- Bradley M. Berkson – U.S. Department of Defense official
- J. Arch Getty – professor of history at UCLA
- Caleb Green – professional basketball player
- Josh Henderson – actor
- Randy Hughes – NFL football player
- Paul James – professional gardener, host of HGTV series Gardening by the Yard, 1996–2009
- Kevin Lilly – NFL football player
- Marcus Nash – NFL football player
- Sybil Robson Orr – Wal-Mart heiress and film producer
- Richard Roberts – son of Oral Roberts
