= Tulsa Golden Hurricane men's basketball statistical leaders =

The Tulsa Golden Hurricane men's basketball statistical leaders are individual statistical leaders of the Tulsa Golden Hurricane men's basketball program in various categories, including points, assists, blocks, rebounds, and steals. Within those areas, the lists identify single-game, single-season, and career leaders. The Golden Hurricanes represent the University of Tulsa in the NCAA's American Athletic Conference.

Tulsa began competing in intercollegiate basketball in 1907. However, the school's record book does not generally list records from before the 1950s, as records from before this period are often incomplete and inconsistent. Since scoring was much lower in this era, and teams played much fewer games during a typical season, it is likely that few or no players from this era would appear on these lists anyway.

The NCAA did not officially record assists as a stat until the 1983–84 season, and blocks and steals until the 1985–86 season, but Tulsa's record books includes players in these stats before these seasons. These lists are updated through the end of the 2020–21 season.

== Scoring ==
Career
| Rk | Player | Points | Seasons |
|---|---|---|---|
| 1 | Shea Seals | 2288 | 1993–94 1994–95 1995–96 1996–97 |
| 2 | Steve Harris | 2272 | 1981–82 1982–83 1983–84 1984–85 |
| 3 | Ben Uzoh | 1951 | 2006–07 2007–08 2008–09 2009–10 |
| 4 | James Woodard | 1881 | 2012–13 2013–14 2014–15 2015–16 |
| 5 | Tracy Moore | 1823 | 1984–85 1985–86 1986–87 1987–88 |
| 6 | Gary Collier | 1610 | 1990–91 1991–92 1992–93 1993–94 |
| 7 | Kevin Johnson | 1577 | 1999–00 2000–01 2001–02 2002–03 |
| 8 | Justin Hurtt | 1542 | 2007–08 2008–09 2009–10 2010–11 |
| 9 | Greg Harrington | 1520 | 1998–99 1999–00 2000–01 2001–02 |
| 10 | Jerome Jordan | 1508 | 2006–07 2007–08 2008–09 2009–10 |

Season
| Rk | Player | Points | Season |
|---|---|---|---|
| 1 | Willie Biles | 788 | 1972–73 |
| 2 | Bob Patterson | 773 | 1954–55 |
| 3 | Steve Harris | 732 | 1984–85 |
| 4 | Gary Collier | 710 | 1993–94 |
| 5 | Shea Seals | 705 | 1996–97 |
| 6 | Bobby Smith | 661 | 1968–69 |
| 7 | PJ Haggerty | 657 | 2023–24 |
| 8 | Steve Harris | 655 | 1983–84 |
| 9 | Willie Biles | 641 | 1973–74 |
| 10 | Justin Hurtt | 640 | 2010–11 |

Single game
| Rk | Player | Points | Season | Opponent |
|---|---|---|---|---|
| 1 | Willie Biles | 48 | 1972–73 | Wichita State |
| | Willie Biles | 48 | 1973–74 | St. Cloud |
| 3 | Steve Bracey | 47 | 1971–72 | Drake |
| | Willie Biles | 47 | 1972–73 | North Texas State |
| 5 | Willie Biles | 46 | 1972–73 | West Texas State |
| 6 | Willie Biles | 43 | 1973–74 | Pan American |
| 7 | David Voss | 42 | 1960–61 | North Texas State |
| | Bill Kusleika | 42 | 1963–64 | SW Louisiana |
| | Willie Biles | 42 | 1972–73 | Kansas State |
| 10 | Bill Kusleika | 41 | 1963–64 | Christian Bros. (Tenn.) |
| | Willie Biles | 41 | 1972–73 | Samford |

== Rebounds ==
Career
| Rk | Player | Rebounds | Seasons |
|---|---|---|---|
| 1 | Michael Ruffin | 1211 | 1995–96 1996–97 1997–98 1998–99 |
| 2 | Jerome Jordan | 983 | 2006–07 2007–08 2008–09 2009–10 |
| 3 | Bobby Goodall | 782 | 1957–58 1958–59 1959–60 |
| 4 | Shea Seals | 777 | 1993–94 1994–95 1995–96 1996–97 |
| 5 | Herb Johnson | 764 | 1981–82 1982–83 1983–84 1984–85 |
| 6 | Bobby Smith | 729 | 1966–67 1967–68 1968–69 |
| 7 | Gene Estes | 721 | 1958–59 1959–60 1960–61 |
| 8 | Kevin Johnson | 719 | 1999–00 2000–01 2001–02 2002–03 |
| 9 | James Woodard | 718 | 2012–13 2013–14 2014–15 2015–16 |
| 10 | Ben Uzoh | 705 | 2006–07 2007–08 2008–09 2009–10 |

Season
| Rk | Player | Rebounds | Season |
|---|---|---|---|
| 1 | Bob Patterson | 370 | 1954–55 |
| 2 | Gene Estes | 358 | 1960–61 |
| 3 | Dana Lewis | 352 | 1970–71 |
| 4 | Michael Ruffin | 342 | 1998–99 |
| 5 | Michael Ruffin | 341 | 1996–97 |
| 6 | Ken Smith | 320 | 1974–75 |
| 7 | Jerome Jordan | 317 | 2009–10 |
| 8 | Dana Lewis | 309 | 1969–70 |
| | Jerome Jordan | 309 | 2007–08 |
| 10 | Jerome Jordan | 308 | 2008–09 |

Single game
| Rk | Player | Rebounds | Season | Opponent |
|---|---|---|---|---|
| 1 | Dana Lewis | 26 | 1969–70 | MacMurray |
| 2 | Michael Ruffin | 24 | 1996–97 | TCU |
| | Gene Estes | 24 | 1960–61 | Texas Western |
| | Gene Estes | 24 | 1960–61 | Oklahoma City |
| 5 | Gene Estes | 23 | 1960–61 | TCU |
| 6 | Bob Patterson | 22 | 1954–55 | Hardin-Simmons |
| | Herman Callands | 22 | 1964–65 | Cincinnati |
| 8 | James King | 21 | 1961–62 | North Texas |
| | Michael Ruffin | 21 | 1996–97 | TCU |
| 10 | Bob Patterson | 20 | 1954–55 | Texas A&M |

== Assists ==
Career
| Rk | Player | Assists | Seasons |
|---|---|---|---|
| 1 | Greg Harrington | 551 | 1998–99 1999–00 2000–01 2001–02 |
| 2 | Shaquille Harrison | 461 | 2012–13 2013–14 2014–15 2015–16 |
| 3 | Byron Boudreaux | 457 | 1983–84 1984–85 1985–86 1986–87 |
| 4 | Ben Uzoh | 425 | 2006–07 2007–08 2008–09 2009–10 |
| 5 | Sterling Taplin | 406 | 2015–16 2016–17 2017–18 2018–19 |
| 6 | Shea Seals | 388 | 1993–94 1994–95 1995–96 1996–97 |
| 7 | Lou Dawkins | 339 | 1989–90 1990–91 1991–92 1992–93 1993–94 |
| 8 | Brett McDade | 336 | 2004–05 2005–06 2006–07 2007–08 |
| 9 | Eric Coley | 335 | 1996–97 1997–98 1998–99 1999–00 |
| 10 | Jason Parker | 322 | 2000–01 2001–02 2002–03 2003–04 |

Season
| Rk | Player | Assists | Season |
|---|---|---|---|
| 1 | Greg Harrington | 201 | 2000–01 |
| 2 | Ricky Ross | 191 | 1983–84 |
| 3 | Dwon Odom | 177 | 2024–25 |
| 4 | Greg Harrington | 176 | 2001–02 |
| 5 | Paul Pressey | 172 | 1980–81 |
| 6 | Byron Boudreaux | 171 | 1986–87 |
| 7 | Tylen Riley | 166 | 2025–26 |
| 8 | Ben Uzoh | 163 | 2009–10 |
| 9 | Byron Boudreaux | 158 | 1985–86 |
| 10 | Reggie Shields | 154 | 1990–91 |

Single game
| Rk | Player | Assists | Season | Opponent |
|---|---|---|---|---|
| 1 | Ricky Ross | 15 | 1983–84 | Indiana State |
| 2 | Reggie Shields | 13 | 1989–90 | Wichita State |
| 3 | Paul Pressey | 12 | 1981–82 | Bradley |
| | Byron Boudreaux | 12 | 1986–87 | USC |
| | Greg Harrington | 12 | 2001–02 | Buffalo |
| | Greg Harrington | 12 | 2001–02 | Fresno State |
| | Elijah Joiner | 12 | 2020–21 | Tulane |
| 8 | Mike Smith | 11 | 1982–83 | West Texas State |
| | Byron Boudreaux | 11 | 1985–86 | Oral Roberts |
| | Byron Boudreaux | 11 | 1986–87 | Creighton |

== Steals ==
Career
| Rk | Player | Steals | Seasons |
|---|---|---|---|
| 1 | Eric Coley | 299 | 1996–97 1997–98 1998–99 1999–00 |
| 2 | Steve Harris | 271 | 1981–82 1982–83 1983–84 1984–85 |
| 3 | Shaquille Harrison | 244 | 2012–13 2013–14 2014–15 2015–16 |
| 4 | Shea Seals | 222 | 1993–94 1994–95 1995–96 1996–97 |
| 5 | Paul Pressey | 191 | 1980–81 1981–82 |
| 6 | Dante Swanson | 179 | 1999–00 2000–01 2001–02 2002–03 |
| 7 | Lou Dawkins | 176 | 1989–90 1990–91 1991–92 1992–93 1993–94 |
| 8 | Jason Parker | 166 | 2000–01 2001–02 2002–03 2003–04 |
| 9 | Ben Uzoh | 162 | 2006–07 2007–08 2008–09 2009–10 |
| 10 | Herb Johnson | 143 | 1981–82 1982–83 1983–84 1984–85 |

Season
| Rk | Player | Steals | Season |
|---|---|---|---|
| 1 | Eric Coley | 123 | 1999–00 |
| 2 | Paul Pressey | 96 | 1980–81 |
| 3 | Paul Pressey | 95 | 1981–82 |
| 4 | Steve Harris | 83 | 1983–84 |
| 5 | Mike Anderson | 81 | 1981–82 |
| 6 | Steve Harris | 79 | 1984–85 |
| 7 | Steve Harris | 68 | 1982–83 |
| 8 | Shaquille Harrison | 67 | 2014–15 |
| 9 | Mark Morse | 66 | 1991–92 |
| 10 | Mark Morse | 65 | 1992–93 |

Single game
| Rk | Player | Steals | Season | Opponent |
|---|---|---|---|---|
| 1 | Paul Pressey | 8 | 1981–82 | Oral Roberts |
| | Eric Coley | 8 | 1999–00 | UAB |
| | Eric Coley | 8 | 1999–00 | Rice |
| | Steve Harris | 8 | 1983–84 | Pepperdine |
| 5 | Paul Pressey | 7 | 1980–81 | Wichita St. |
| | Paul Pressey | 7 | 1980–81 | West Virginia |
| | Steve Harris | 7 | 1984–85 | Oklahoma |
| | Steve Harris | 7 | 1984–85 | Creighton |
| | Eric Coley | 7 | 1997–98 | Nebraska |
| | Eric Coley | 7 | 1999–00 | St. Joseph's |
| | Eric Coley | 7 | 1999–00 | SW Missouri State |
| | Eric Coley | 7 | 1999–00 | Boston College |
| | Shaquille Harrison | 7 | 2012–13 | LSU Shreveport |

== Blocks ==
Career
| Rk | Player | Blocks | Seasons |
|---|---|---|---|
| 1 | Jerome Jordan | 333 | 2006–07 2007–08 2008–09 2009–10 |
| 2 | Michael Ruffin | 266 | 1995–96 1996–97 1997–98 1998–99 |
| 3 | Kevin Johnson | 251 | 1999–00 2000–01 2001–02 2002–03 |
| 4 | Brandon Swannegan | 148 | 2012–13 2013–14 2014–15 2015–16 |
| 5 | Eric Coley | 136 | 1996–97 1997–98 1998–99 1999–00 |
| 6 | Steven Idlet | 118 | 2008–09 2009–10 2010–11 2011–12 |
| 7 | Anthony Price | 101 | 2002–03 2003–04 2004–05 2005–06 |
| 8 | Ben Uzoh | 99 | 2006–07 2007–08 2008–09 2009–10 |
| 9 | Bruce Vanley | 93 | 1980–81 1981–82 1982–83 1983–84 |
| 10 | Alyn Thomsen | 86 | 1986–87 1987–88 1988–89 1989–90 1990–91 |

Season
| Rk | Player | Blocks | Season |
|---|---|---|---|
| 1 | Jerome Jordan | 143 | 2007–08 |
| 2 | Jerome Jordan | 91 | 2008–09 |
| 3 | Michael Ruffin | 86 | 1998–99 |
| | Kevin Johnson | 86 | 2000–01 |
| 5 | Jerome Jordan | 82 | 2009–10 |
| 6 | Michael Ruffin | 78 | 1997–98 |
| 7 | Kevin Johnson | 76 | 2002–03 |
| 8 | Kevin Johnson | 71 | 2001–02 |
| 9 | Michael Ruffin | 56 | 1996–97 |
| 10 | Kodi Maduka | 53 | 2011–12 |

Single game
| Rk | Player | Blocks | Season | Opponent |
|---|---|---|---|---|
| 1 | Michael Ruffin | 9 | 1997–98 | Tulane |
| 2 | Kevin Johnson | 8 | 2000–01 | TCU |
| 3 | Jerome Jordan | 8 | 2007–08 | Tulane |
| | Jerome Jordan | 8 | 2007–08 | East Carolina |
| | Jerome Jordan | 8 | 2007–08 | Bradley |
| 6 | Bruce Vanley | 7 | 1982–83 | Oral Roberts |
| | Alyn Thomsen | 7 | 1990–91 | SW Missouri State |
| | Michael Ruffin | 7 | 1998–99 | Marquette |
| | Michael Ruffin | 7 | 1998–99 | Wyoming |
| | Kevin Johnson | 7 | 2001–02 | Rice |
| | Jerome Jordan | 7 | 2007–08 | Mississippi Valley St. |
| | Jerome Jordan | 7 | 2007–08 | Marshall |
| | Kodi Maduka | 7 | 2011–12 | Western Kentucky |
