= John Phillips (basketball coach) =

American basketball coach (born 1947)

John Thomas Phillips (born February 6, 1947) is a former college basketball coach and current head high school basketball coach for Summit Christian Academy. Phillips was hired as the head coach at the University of Tulsa after Buzz Peterson left to take the head coaching position with the Tennessee Volunteers.

== Assistant coaching career ==
Phillips started his assistant coaching career under Eddie Sutton at Oklahoma State, where he coached for two years. Bill Self brought him onto his staff at Tulsa in his first season, and Phillips remained after Self left for the University of Illinois. He helped coach Tulsa to a win in the 2001 National Invitation Tournament before being promoted to head coach.

== Head coaching record ==
Record table
Season	Team	Overall	Conference	Standing	Postseason
Tulsa Golden Hurricane (Western Athletic Conference) (2001–2004)
2001–02	Tulsa	27–7	15–3	T–1st	NCAA Division I Second Round
2002–03	Tulsa	23–10	12–6	2nd	NCAA Division I Second Round
2003–04	Tulsa	9–20	5–13	T–8th	
2004–05	Tulsa	2–5	–	–	
Tulsa:		61–42	32–22		
Total:		61–42			
National champion Postseason invitational champion Conference regular season champion Conference regular season and conference tournament champion Division regular season champion Division regular season and conference tournament champion Conference tournament champion

== Personal life ==
John Phillips also coached high school sports for 16 years, most notably at Broken Arrow High School, where he coached in between his assistant coach roles at Oklahoma State and Tulsa and won a state championship. Oklahoma State Senate Resolution 18 commends Phillips for his performance in leading Broken Arrow to the state championship and his previous postseason runs as a high school coach.
