= Clarence Iba =

American basketball player and coach

Biographical details
- Born: April 20, 1909
- Died: April 21, 1997 (aged 88); Fort Worth, Texas, U.S.

Playing career
- 1929–1933: Northwest Missouri State

Coaching career (HC unless noted)
- 1936–1937: Oklahoma Panhandle A&M
- 1949–1960: Tulsa

Head coaching record
- Overall: 151–153

Accomplishments and honors

Championships
- MVC regular season (1955)

Awards
- MVC Coach of the Year (1955)

Clarence Victor Iba (April 20, 1909 – April 21, 1997) was the head basketball coach at the University of Tulsa. Iba coached the Tulsa Golden Hurricane men's basketball team for eleven seasons, from 1949 to 1960. He is the brother of former Oklahoma State coach Henry Iba.

When Iba was hired in 1949, he became Tulsa's first full-time basketball coach. Iba led the team to a NIT appearance in 1953, the first postseason appearance for Tulsa in the modern era. Tulsa also made the Associated Press college basketball rankings for the first time in the 1952–53 season, reaching as high as #8 in the poll. The 1954–55 season was Iba's best at the school. Tulsa won the Missouri Valley Conference with a 21–7 record, including 8–2 in conference. This was the first twenty-win season in school history. Tulsa advanced to the 1955 NCAA Tournament, its first appearance in that tourney. After being eliminated in the first round, Tulsa won the consolation bracket. Additionally, Tulsa's first all-American, Bob Patterson, was from that same 1954–55 campaign.

Iba's last few years at Tulsa were not as successful as the 1954–55 campaign. He does, however, have the longest coaching tenure in school history, and his 137 wins were the most in Tulsa history until Doug Wojcik passed him in 2012. Following his career as a coach, he worked as a marketing executive in Fort Worth, Texas. Iba was inducted into the University of Tulsa Hall of Fame in 1994.

Iba died on April 21, 1997, of an aortic aneurysm.

== Head coaching record ==
Record table
Season	Team	Overall	Conference	Standing	Postseason
Panhandle A&M Aggies () (1936–1937)
1936–37	Panhandle A&M	14–6			
Panhandle A&M:		14–6 (.700)			
Tulsa Golden Hurricane (Missouri Valley Conference) (1949–1960)
1949–50	Tulsa	12–11	3–9	6th	
1950–51	Tulsa	10–17	4–10	T–6th	
1951–52	Tulsa	14–10	5–5	3rd	
1952–53	Tulsa	15–10	5–5	T–2nd	NIT First Round
1953–54	Tulsa	15–14	5–5	3rd	
1954–55	Tulsa	20–8	8–2	T–1st	NCAA Sweet Sixteen
1955–56	Tulsa	10–16	4–8	5th	
1956–57	Tulsa	8–17	5–9	T–4th	
1957–58	Tulsa	7–19	4–10	7th	
1958–59	Tulsa	10–15	2–12	T–7th	
1959–60	Tulsa	9–17	5–9	6th	
Tulsa:		137–147 (.482)	50–84 (.373)		
Total:		151–153 (.497)			
National champion Postseason invitational champion Conference regular season champion Conference regular season and conference tournament champion Division regular season champion Division regular season and conference tournament champion Conference tournament champion
