= McLain High School =

Public high school in Tulsa, Oklahoma, US

Raymond S. McLain Magnet High School for Science and Technology

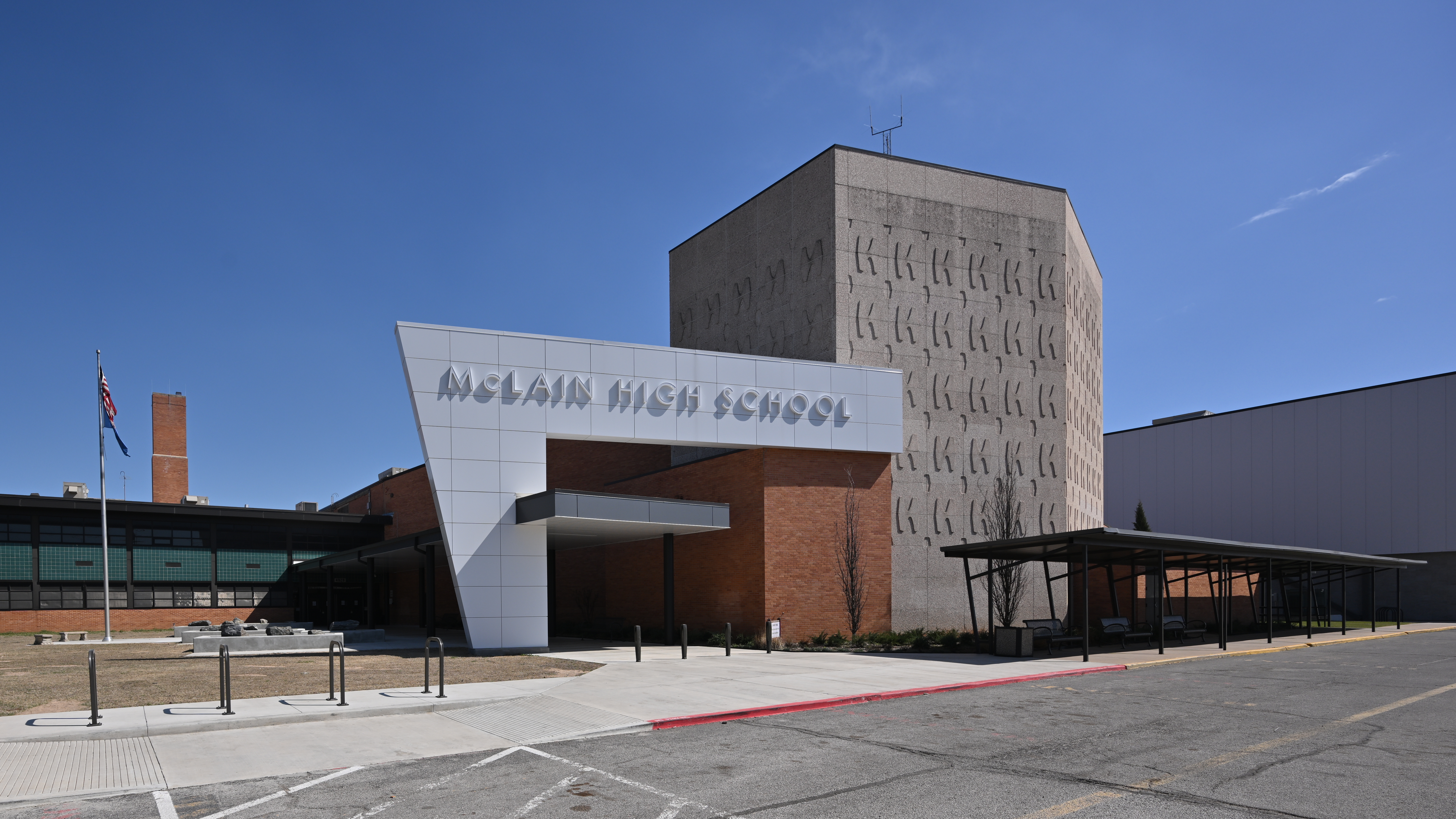

Location
- 4929 N. Peoria Ave. Tulsa, Oklahoma 74126; United States; 36.225648°N 95.974164°W

Information
- Type: Co-educational; public; secondary; special education
- Established: 1959
- Staff: 39.96 (FTE)
- Grades: 9-12
- Enrollment: 726 (2023–2024)
- Student to teacher ratio: 18.17
- Colors: Maroon; Black; Silver; White
- Mascot: Titan
- Website: mclain.tulsaschools.org

McLain High School for Science and Technology is a high school in Tulsa, Oklahoma, United States. It was named after U.S. Army Lieutenant General Raymond S. McLain. McLain Magnet High School is one of eleven high schools in Tulsa Public Schools.

== History ==
McLain High School was opened at its current location on North Peoria Avenue in 1959, making it (then and now) the northernmost high school in the Tulsa Public Schools district. Its namesake was the recently deceased Raymond S. McLain, an Oklahoma City "entrepreneur, civic leader, and soldier" whose career with the Oklahoma National Guard and the U.S. Army spanned almost four decades. McLain High graduated its first class of seniors in 1961. The school's teams competed for several decades under the colors maroon and white and the name "Scots," a nod to General McLain's heritage. The school's yearbook was known as The Highlander.

From its inception until the early 1970s, McLain High School served primarily white students. During the 1970s, changing demographics on Tulsa's north side caused McLain's student body to shift to a primarily African-American composition. At the same time, Booker T. Washington High School, which had historically served black students during segregation, was restructured as a magnet school that would serve both black and white students in equal proportions.

In 1997, the Tulsa Public Schools' first black superintendent, John Thompson, spearheaded the McLain Initiative, a reform encompassing four schools in McLain's feeder pattern: Houston Elementary School, Gilcrease Intermediate School, Monroe Middle School, and McLain High School. The McLain Initiative instituted self-esteem and conflict resolution programs, along with a comprehensive re-staffing of all schools and a federally funded 5% salary boost for teachers in the feeder pattern. The McLain Initiative resulted in incremental gains in test scores in the feeder pattern, and it was renewed by the school board for an additional year beyond its initial three-year lifespan.

In 2001, McLain High School (then operating under the name McLain Career Academy) was rebranded as the Tulsa School of Science and Technology (TSST), with students voting to change the mascot from Scots to Titans. This change was targeted at improving McLain's academic performance, then the lowest of all high schools in the district. In later years, TSST would revert to its original name, becoming McLain Magnet High School for Science and Technology, but keeping the Titan mascot and using maroon, white, silver, and black as school colors. In the years since, the name has changed again to McLain High School for Science and Technology.

On September 30, 2022, a student was killed, and another student, an adult, and child were wounded in a shooting after a homecoming football game.

== Athletics ==
McLain High School is currently classified as a 4A school by the Oklahoma Secondary Schools Activities Association. It has won six state championships. McLain plays home football games at Melvin Driver Stadium, named for McLain's Hall of Fame coach, who led the Scots to three state titles in the 1970s and 80s.

=== State championships ===
- Baseball 1: 1967
- Boys basketball 1: 1990
- Boys' cross country 1: 1970
- Football 3: 1978, 1986, 1987

== Notable alumni ==
- Josh Jacobs (Class of 2016), NFL running back
- Shea Seals (Class of 1993), former NBA player, now director of player development at the University of Tulsa, played and coached at McLain
- Mike Turpen (Class of 1968), Democratic politician, lawyer, and former attorney general of Oklahoma (1983-1987)
