= 2002–03 Tulsa Golden Hurricane men's basketball team =

American college basketball season

2002–03 Tulsa Golden Hurricane men's basketball

WAC tournament champion

NCAA tournament, second round
- Conference: Western Athletic Conference
- Record: 23–10 (12–6 WAC)
- Head coach: John Phillips (2nd season)
- Home arena: Reynolds Center

2002–03 WAC men's basketball standings
	Conf.				Overall
Team	W		L	PCT	W		L	PCT
Fresno State	13	–	5	.722	20	–	8	.714
Tulsa †	12	–	6	.667	23	–	10	.697
SMU	11	–	7	.611	17	–	13	.567
Nevada	11	–	7	.611	18	–	14	.563
Rice	11	–	7	.611	19	–	10	.655
Hawaii	9	–	9	.500	19	–	12	.613
Louisiana Tech	9	–	9	.500	12	–	15	.444
Boise State	7	–	11	.389	13	–	16	.448
San Jose State	4	–	14	.222	7	–	21	.250
UTEP	3	–	15	.167	6	–	24	.200
† 2003 WAC tournament winner

The 2002–03 Tulsa Golden Hurricane men's basketball team represented the University of Tulsa as a member of the Western Athletic Conference in the 2002–03 college basketball season. The Golden Hurricane played their home games at the Reynolds Center. Led by head coach John Phillips, they finished the season 23–10 overall and 12–6 in conference play to finish second in the WAC standings. The team won the 2003 WAC men's basketball tournament to earn an automatic bid to the NCAA tournament as No. 13 seed in the Midwest region. The Golden Hurricane upset No. 4 seed Dayton in the first round, before falling to Wisconsin in the Round of 32.

== Roster ==
2002–03 Tulsa Golden Hurricane men's basketball team
Players
Coaches

Pos.	#	Name	Height	Weight	Year	Hometown
G	1	Dante Swanson	5 ft 10 in (1.78 m)	180 lb (82 kg)	Sr	Wagoner, OK
G	2	Chris Wallace	6 ft 2 in (1.88 m)	198 lb (90 kg)	Fr	Broken Arrow, OK
G	3	Antonio Reed	5 ft 10 in (1.78 m)	170 lb (77 kg)	Sr	Tulsa, OK
F	4	Jarius Glenn	6 ft 6 in (1.98 m)	220 lb (100 kg)	So	Decatur, GA
G	12	Kyle Blankenship	6 ft 0 in (1.83 m)	185 lb (84 kg)	So	Shreveport, LA
G	14	Jason Parker	6 ft 2 in (1.88 m)	180 lb (82 kg)	Jr	Tulsa, OK
G	24	Seneca Collins	6 ft 5 in (1.96 m)	240 lb (109 kg)	Fr	Dallas, TX
F	32	Marqus Ledoux	6 ft 8 in (2.03 m)	210 lb (95 kg)	Sr	Baton Rouge, LA
F	33	Charlie Davis	6 ft 7 in (2.01 m)	232 lb (105 kg)	Sr	Grand Prairie, TX
F	34	Kevin Johnson	6 ft 7 in (2.01 m)	222 lb (101 kg)	Sr	Missouri City, TX
F	50	Anthony Price	6 ft 8 in (2.03 m)	250 lb (113 kg)	Fr	The Woodlands, TX

Head coach

John Phillips

Assistant coach(es)

Legend

- (C) Team captain
- (S) Suspended
- (I) Ineligible
- (W) Walk-on
- Injured
- Current redshirt

== Schedule and results ==
Date time, TV	Rank^{#}	Opponent^{#}	Result	Record	Site (attendance) city, state
Regular Season
Nov 23, 2002*	No. 25	vs. New Mexico State	W 71–61	1–0	South Padre Island Convention Centre (950); South Padre Island, TX
Nov 24, 2002*	No. 25	vs. Texas-Pan American	W 80–50	2–0	South Padre Island Convention Centre (950); South Padre Island, TX
Nov 30, 2002*	No. 22	at Arkansas	W 61–60	3–0	Bud Walton Arena (16,473); Fayetteville, AR
Dec 4, 2002*	No. 19	Wichita State	W 80–69	4–0	Reynolds Center (8,045); Tulsa, OK
Dec 11, 2002*	No. 17	No. 20 Kansas	L 80–89	4–1	Reynolds Center (8,555); Tulsa, OK
Dec 14, 2002*	No. 17	at Missouri State	W 62–46	5–1	Hammons Student Center (6,484); Springfield, MO
Dec 19, 2002*	No. 22	Oral Roberts	W 90–80	6–1	Reynolds Center (8,465); Tulsa, OK
Dec 23, 2002*	No. 20	TCU	W 78–65	7–1	Reynolds Center (8,355); Tulsa, OK
Dec 28, 2002*	No. 20	Iowa	L 63–67	7–2	Reynolds Center (8,495); Tulsa, OK
Jan 1, 2003		at Fresno State	L 65–74	7–3 (0–1)	Selland Arena (9,590); Fresno, CA
Jan 4, 2003		Nevada	W 63–60	8–3 (1–1)	Reynolds Center (7,865); Tulsa, OK
Jan 11, 2003		at Rice	W 94–77	9–3 (2–1)	Rice Gymnasium (3,278); Houston, TX
Jan 16, 2003		at UTEP	W 79–65	10–3 (3–1)	Don Haskins Center (5,531); El Paso, TX
Jan 18, 2003		at Boise State	L 74–78	10–4 (3–2)	BSU Pavilion (4,925); Boise, ID
Jan 23, 2003		Louisiana Tech	W 68–61	11–4 (4–2)	Reynolds Center (8,245); Tulsa, OK
Jan 25, 2003		SMU	L 84–86 ^{OT}	11–5 (4–3)	Reynolds Center (8,405); Tulsa, OK
Jan 30, 2003		at San Jose State	L 57–58	11–6 (4–4)	Event Center Arena (1,337); San Jose, CA
Feb 1, 2003		at Hawaii	L 67–73	11–8 (4–5)	Stan Sheriff Center (9,861); Honolulu, HI
Feb 8, 2003		Rice	W 79–56	12–8 (5–5)	Reynolds Center (7,985); Tulsa, OK
Feb 10, 2003		at Louisiana Tech	L 82–93	12–8 (5–6)	Thomas Assembly Center (3,142); Ruston, LA
Feb 13, 2003		Boise State	W 71–55	13–8 (6–6)	Reynolds Center (8,021); Tulsa, OK
Feb 15, 2003		UTEP	W 81–58	14–8 (7–6)	Reynolds Center (8,094); Tulsa, OK
Feb 19, 2003		at SMU	W 77–70	15–8 (8–6)	Moody Coliseum (3,126); Dallas, TX
Feb 22, 2003*; 8:00 p.m., ESPN		at Gonzaga	L 60–69	15–9	Charlotte Y. Martin Centre (4,000); Spokane, WA
Feb 27, 2003		Hawaii	W 76–51	16–9 (9–6)	Reynolds Center (8,182); Tulsa, OK
Mar 1, 2003		San Jose State	W 74–53	17–9 (10–6)	Reynolds Center (8,355); Tulsa, OK
Mar 5, 2003		Fresno State	W 62–59	18–9 (11–6)	Reynolds Center (8,440); Tulsa, OK
Mar 8, 2003		at Nevada	W 79–73	19–9 (12–6)	Lawlor Events Center (11,166); Reno, NV
WAC tournament
Mar 13, 2003*	(1)	(9) UTEP; Quarterfinals	W 81–47	20–9	Reynolds Center (4,735); Tulsa, OK
Mar 14, 2003*	(1)	(5) Hawaii; Semifinals	W 66–56	21–9	Reynolds Center (6,134); Tulsa, OK
Mar 15, 2003*	(1)	(3) Nevada; Championship	W 75–64	22–9	Reynolds Center (5,326); Tulsa, OK
NCAA tournament
Mar 20, 2003*	(13 MW)	vs. (4 MW) No. 16 Dayton; First Round	W 84–71	23–9	Spokane Veterans Memorial Arena (11,171); Spokane, WA
Mar 22, 2003*	(13 MW)	vs. (5 MW) No. 21 Wisconsin; Second Round	L 60–61	23–10	Spokane Veterans Memorial Arena (11,271); Spokane, WA
*Non-conference game. ^{#}Rankings from AP Poll. (#) Tournament seedings in parentheses. MW=Midwest. All times are in Central.
