= 1983–84 Illinois State Redbirds men's basketball team =

American college basketball season

1983–84 Illinois State Redbirds men's basketball

MVC Regular Season Co-Champion

NCAA tournament, Second Round
- Conference: Missouri Valley Conference
- Record: 23–8 (13–3 MVC)
- Head coach: Bob Donewald (6th season)
- Home arena: Horton Field House

1983–84 Missouri Valley Conference men's basketball standings
	Conf.				Overall
Team	W		L	PCT	W		L	PCT
Illinois State	13	–	3	.813	23	–	8	.742
No. 12 Tulsa †	13	–	3	.813	27	–	4	.871
Wichita State	11	–	5	.688	18	–	12	.600
Creighton	8	–	8	.500	17	–	14	.548
Bradley	7	–	9	.438	15	–	13	.536
Southern Illinois	7	–	9	.438	15	–	13	.536
Indiana State	6	–	10	.375	14	–	14	.500
Drake	4	–	12	.250	8	–	20	.286
West Texas State	3	–	13	.188	8	–	19	.296
† 1984 MVC tournament winner Rankings from AP Poll

The 1983–84 Illinois State Redbirds men's basketball team represented Illinois State University during the 1983–84 NCAA Division I men's basketball season. The Redbirds, led by sixth year head coach Bob Donewald, played their home games at Horton Field House and were members of the Missouri Valley Conference.

The Redbirds finished the season 23–8, 13–3 in conference play to finish in a tie for first place. They were the number one seed for the Missouri Valley Conference tournament by virtue of sweeping the season series over the University of Tulsa. They were defeated in a semifinal game to Creighton University.

The Redbirds received an at-large bid to the 1984 NCAA Division I men's basketball tournament. They were assigned to the Midwest Regional as the number eight seed where they defeated the University of Alabama in the first round and lost to DePaul University in the second round.

== Roster ==
1983–84 Illinois State Redbirds men's basketball team
Players
Coaches

Pos.	#	Name	Height	Weight	Year	Hometown
F	52	Hank Cornley	6 ft 7 in (2.01 m)	—	Sr	Columbus, OH
C	45	Mark Zwart	6 ft 8 in (2.03 m)	—	Sr	Monona, WI
G	33	Brad Duncan	6 ft 4 in (1.93 m)	—	Jr	Anderson, IN
G	24	Rickie Johnson	6 ft 5 in (1.96 m)	—	Jr	Indianapolis, IN
G	10	Michael McKenny	6 ft 1 in (1.85 m)	—	Jr	Gary, IN
F	43	Lou Stefanovic	6 ft 8 in (2.03 m)	—	Jr	Merillville, IN
G	25	William Anderson	5 ft 11 in (1.8 m)	—	So	Indianapolis, IN
G	32	Kirk Francis	6 ft 7 in (2.01 m)	—	So	Kewanee, IL
F	34	Jim McGrath	6 ft 8 in (2.03 m)	—	RS Fr	Ottawa, IL
C	54	Bill Braksick	7 ft 0 in (2.13 m)	—	Fr	Flanagan, IL
F	44	Eric Cornley	6 ft 5 in (1.96 m)	—	Fr	Columbus, OH
F	35	Derrick Sanders	6 ft 6 in (1.98 m)	—	Fr	Chicago, IL

Head coach

- Bob Donewald (Hanover)

Assistant coach(es)

- Jim Platt
- Terry Smith
- Pat Cunningham
- Bruce Stone
- Anthony Jones
- Dwayne Tyus

Legend

- (C) Team captain
- (S) Suspended
- (I) Ineligible
- (W) Walk-on
- Injured
- Current redshirt

== Schedule ==
Date time, TV	Rank^{#}	Opponent^{#}	Result	Record	High points	High rebounds	High assists	Site (attendance) city, state
Exhibition Season
November 15, 1983*; 7:30 pm		Republic of Turkey	W 63–54		14 – Johnson	10 – Zwart	–	Horton Field House (6,171); Normal, IL
Regular Season
November 26, 1983*; 7:30 pm, WBLN		Tennessee–Martin	W 68–56	1–0	19 – Johnson	6 – Zwart	–	Horton Field House (4,599); Normal, IL
November 29, 1983*; 7:30 pm		at South Alabama	W 84–70	2–0	32 – Johnson	5 – H.Cornley, Zwart	–	Jaguar Gym (3,122); Mobile, AL
December 3, 1983*; 7:30 pm		at No. 16 DePaul	L 66–69	2–1	16 – Johnson	9 – H.Cornley, Johnson	–	Rosemont Horizon (13,057); Rosemont, IL
December 5, 1983*; 7:30 pm		at Illinois–Chicago	W 92–79	3–1	24 – Stefanovic	11 – Zwart	–	UIC Pavilion (1,004); Chicago, IL
December 10, 1983*; 2:45 pm, WBLN		Wisconsin–Green Bay	W 77–55	4–1	25 – H.Cornley	14 – H.Cornley	–	Horton Field House (6,497); Normal, IL
December 16, 1983*; 6:00 pm		vs. Utah State; Indiana Classic [Semifinal]	W 80–74	5–1	26 – H.Cornley	8 – Stefanovic	–	Assembly Hall (10,119); Bloomington, IN
December 17, 1983*; 8:00 pm		at Indiana; Indiana Classic [Final]	L 44–54	5–2	12 – Johnson	10 – H.Cornley	–	Assembly Hall (14,123); Bloomington, IN
December 22, 1983*; 7:30 pm		Northern Iowa	W 67–46	6–2	20 – H.Cornley	7 – Zwart	–	Horton Field House (6,598); Normal, IL
December 27, 1983*; 6:00 pm		vs. Baylor; Golden Triangle Classic [Semifinal]	W 65–36	7–2	16 – H.Cornley	15 – H.Cornley	–	Civic Arena (6,000); Pittsburgh, PA
December 28, 1983*; 8:00 pm		vs. Pittsburgh; Golden Triangle Classic [Final]	L 54–59	7–3	16 – H.Cornley	11 – Zwart	–	Civic Arena (1,981); Pittsburgh, PA
January 2, 1984; 7:30 pm		at Creighton	W 63–54	8–3 (1–0)	15 – Johnson	4 – H.Cornley, Stefanovic	3 – H.Cornley, Johnson, Stefanovic	Omaha Civic Auditorium (5,462); Omaha, NE
January 7, 1984; 12:30 pm		Wichita State	W 80–66	9–3 (2–0)	23 – Johnson	9 – Stefanovic	3 – Johnson, McKenny, Stefanovic	Horton Field House (7,667); Normal, IL
January 10, 1984*; 7:30 pm		U. S. International	W 80–66	10–3	20 – Duncan	7 – Zwart, Braksick	–	Horton Field House (6,364); Normal, IL
January 14, 1984; 7:35 pm		at Drake	W 67–52	11–3 (3–0)	23 – Stefanovic	10 – Stefanovic	–	Veterans Memorial Auditorium (5,880); Des Moines, IA
January 19, 1984; 7:30 pm		at No. 13 Tulsa	W 79–73	12–3 (4–0)	26 – McKenny	6 – H.Cornley, Zwart, Johnson, Stafanovic	–	Tulsa Convention Center (9,200); Tulsa, OK
January 21, 1984; 2:45 pm, WBLN		Indiana State	W 87–70	13–3 (5–0)	23 – Stefanovic	11 – Braksick	–	Horton Field House (7,745); Normal, IL
January 26, 1984; 8:05 pm		at Wichita State	L 66–68	13–4 (5–1)	14 – H.Cornley, Johnson	11 – H.Cornley	6 – McKenny	Henry Levitt Arena (10,466); Wichita, KS
January 28, 1984; 2:45 pm, WBLN		Southern Illinois	W 90–62	14–4 (6–1)	18 – Duncan, Johnson, Stefanovic	7 – Zwart, Sanders	–	Horton Field House (7,731); Normal, IL
February 4, 1984; 7:30 pm		at West Texas State	W 93–82	15–4 (7–1)	22 – Zwart	10 – Stefanovic	–	WTSU Fieldhouse (2,475); Canyon, TX
February 9, 1984; 7:30 pm, WBLN		Drake	W 76–41	16–4 (8–1)	11 – H.Cornley	9 – Braksick	–	Horton Field House (7,747); Normal, IL
February 11, 1984; 2:45 pm		Creighton	W 84–65	17–4 (9–1)	22 – H.Cornley	13 – H.Cornley	–	Horton Field House (7,775); Normal, IL
February 13, 1984; 7:30 pm		West Texas State	W 86–72	18–4 (10–1)	24 – H.Cornley	15 – H.Cornley	–	Horton Field House (7,747); Normal, IL
February 18, 1984; 8:05 pm, WEEK		at Bradley	W 56–50	19–4 (11–1)	15 – Johnson	6 – H.Cornley	–	Carver Arena (10,401); Peoria, IL
February 23, 1984; 7:30 pm		at Southern Illinois	L 98–105	19–5 (11–2)	24 – Duncan	9 – H.Cornley	–	SIU Arena (6,235); Carbondale, IL
February 25, 1984; 6:30 pm		at Indiana State	L 47–54	19–6 (11–3)	16 – Duncan	11 – H.Cornley	–	Hulman Center (7,182); Terre Haute, IN
March 1, 1984; 7:30 pm, WBLN		Bradley	W 55–46	20–6 (12–3)	18 – Duncan	5 – H.Cornley	–	Horton Field House (7,747); Normal, IL
March 3, 1984; 12:30 pm		No. 9 Tulsa	W 91–81	21–6 (13–3)	25 – H.Cornley	10 – H.Cornley	–	Horton Field House (7,801); Normal, IL
Missouri Valley Conference {MVC} tournament
March 8, 1984*	(1)	(8) Drake; Quarterfinal	W 91–62	22–6	21 – Zwart	8 – H.Cornley	5 – McKenny	Horton Field House (6,648); Normal, IL
March 9, 1984*	(1)	(4) Creighton; Semifinal	L 59–69	22–7	16 – Zwart	8 – Zwart	6 – McKenny	Horton Field House (6,372); Normal, IL
National Collegiate Athletic Association {NCAA} tournament
March 16, 1984*; 7:00 pm, NCAA Productions	(8)	vs. (9) Alabama; Midwest Region [First Round]	W 49–48	23–7	10 – H.Cornley, McKenny	11 – Zwart	5 – McKenny	Bob Devaney Sports Center (12,038); Lincoln, NE
March 18, 1984*; 1:15 pm, CBS	(8)	vs. (1) No. 4 DePaul; Midwest Region [Second Round]	L 61–75	23–8	14 – Johnson	6 – H.Cornley, Zwart	3 – Duncan	Bob Devaney Sports Center (13,440); Lincoln, NE
*Non-conference game. ^{#}Rankings from AP Poll. (#) Tournament seedings in parentheses. All times are in Central Standard Time.
