= 2002–03 Hawaii Rainbow Warriors basketball team =

American college basketball season

2002–03 Hawaii Rainbow Warriors basketball

NIT, Second Round
- Conference: Western Athletic Conference
- Record: 19–12 (9–9 WAC)
- Head coach: Riley Wallace (16th season)
- Associate head coach: Bob Nash (16th season)
- Assistant coaches: Jackson Wheeler (13th season); Bob Burke (1st season)
- Home arena: Stan Sheriff Center

2002–03 WAC men's basketball standings
	Conf.				Overall
Team	W		L	PCT	W		L	PCT
Fresno State	13	–	5	.722	20	–	8	.714
Tulsa †	12	–	6	.667	23	–	10	.697
SMU	11	–	7	.611	17	–	13	.567
Nevada	11	–	7	.611	18	–	14	.563
Rice	11	–	7	.611	19	–	10	.655
Hawaii	9	–	9	.500	19	–	12	.613
Louisiana Tech	9	–	9	.500	12	–	15	.444
Boise State	7	–	11	.389	13	–	16	.448
San Jose State	4	–	14	.222	7	–	21	.250
UTEP	3	–	15	.167	6	–	24	.200
† 2003 WAC tournament winner

The 2002–03 Hawaii Rainbow Warriors basketball team represented the University of Hawaiʻi at Mānoa in the 2002–03 NCAA Division I men's basketball season. The Rainbow Warriors, led by head coach, Riley Wallace, played their home games at the Stan Sheriff Center in Honolulu, Hawaii, as members of the Western Athletic Conference. Hawaii finished in a tie for 6th in the WAC during the regular season and won one game in the WAC tournament before falling in the semifinals to Tulsa.

Hawaii failed to qualify for the NCAA tournament, but was selected to participate in the NIT, earning a postseason bid for a school-record third consecutive season. In the NIT, the Rainbow Warriors won their first game, but were eliminated in the second round of the tournament by Minnesota, 70–58.

== Roster ==
2002–03 Hawaii Rainbow Warriors men's basketball team
Players
Coaches

Pos.	#	Name	Height	Weight	Year	Hometown
F	2	Phil Martin	6 ft 8 in (2.03 m)	—	Jr	Hamilton, Ontario, Canada
G	3	Ramsey Williams	5 ft 11 in (1.8 m)	—	Jr	Honolulu, Hawaii
G	4	Gabe Lombard	5 ft 9 in (1.75 m)	—	So	Pago Pago, Guam
G	10	Lance Takaki	5 ft 4 in (1.63 m)	—	Sr	Honolulu, Hawaii
F	11	Ikaika Alama-Francis	6 ft 7 in (2.01 m)	—	Fr	Kaneohe, Hawaii
C	12	Milos Zivanovic	6 ft 11 in (2.11 m)	—	RS Fr	Belgrade, Serbia and Montenegro
G	13	Jason Carter	5 ft 10 in (1.78 m)	—	Jr	Gary, Indiana
F/C	14	Haim Shimonovich	6 ft 10 in (2.08 m)	—	Jr	Rishon LeZion, Israel
G	15	Mark Campbell	6 ft 4 in (1.93 m)	—	Sr	Mount Vernon, Washington
G/F	22	Vaidotas Peciukas	6 ft 7 in (2.01 m)	—	So	Joniškis, Lithuania
G	23	Carl English	6 ft 5 in (1.96 m)	—	Jr	Patrick's Cove, Newfoundland, Canada
G/F	24	Michael Kuebler	6 ft 5 in (1.96 m)	—	Jr	Salem, Oregon
G	25	Ryne Holliday	6 ft 1 in (1.85 m)	—	Sr	Belleville, Illinois
F	32	Dan Pickart	6 ft 7 in (2.01 m)	—	So	Novato, California
F	40	Paul Jesinskis	6 ft 8 in (2.03 m)	—	Sr	Assagay, South Africa
F	54	Nkeruwem Akpan	6 ft 8 in (2.03 m)	—	So	Akwa Ibom, Nigeria

Head coach

- Riley Wallace (Centenary)

Assistant coach(es)

- Bob Nash (Hawaiʻi)
- Jackson Wheeler (Marymount (KS))
- Bob Burke (Campbell)

Legend

- (C) Team captain
- (S) Suspended
- (I) Ineligible
- (W) Walk-on
- Injured
- Current redshirt

Roster
Last update: January 19, 2023

== Schedule and results ==
Date time, TV	Rank^{#}	Opponent^{#}	Result	Record	Site (attendance) city, state
Preseason
November 17, 2002*; 5:00 pm		EA Sports California All–Stars; Exhibition	L 72–73	—	Stan Sheriff Center; Honolulu, HI
Regular season
November 22, 2002*; 7:00 pm		Arkansas–Little Rock; Hawaiian Airlines Tip-Off Tournament	W 76–52	1–0	Stan Sheriff Center (6,823); Honolulu, HI
November 24, 2002*; 7:00 pm		Texas A&M–Corpus Christi; Hawaiian Airlines Tip-Off Tournament	W 100–81	2–0	Stan Sheriff Center (6,344); Honolulu, HI
December 9, 2002*; 7:00 pm		Hawaii–Hilo; Exhibition	W 73–60	—	Stan Sheriff Center; Honolulu, HI
December 14, 2002*; 5:00 pm		at San Diego State	L 49–60	2–1	Cox Arena at Aztec Bowl (6,138); San Diego, CA
December 20, 2002*; 8:00 pm		Eastern Illinois; Adidas Festival	W 81–65	3–1	Stan Sheriff Center (6,133); Honolulu, HI
December 21, 2002*; 8:00 pm		New Orleans; Adidas Festival	W 68–56	4–1	Stan Sheriff Center (6,096); Honolulu, HI
December 27, 2002*; 7:00 pm		Bradley; Rainbow Classic	W 90–69	5–1	Stan Sheriff Center (7,366); Honolulu, HI
December 29, 2002*; 7:30 pm		Tennessee Tech; Rainbow Classic	W 74–61	6–1	Stan Sheriff Center (7,184); Honolulu, HI
December 30, 2002*; 7:30 pm		Butler; Rainbow Classic	W 81–78 ^{OT}	7–1	Stan Sheriff Center (7,925); Honolulu, HI
January 2, 2003; 4:05 pm		at UTEP	W 64–52	8–1 (1–0)	Don Haskins Center (5,199); El Paso, TX
January 4, 2003; 10:00 am		at Boise State	L 63–65 ^{OT}	8–2 (1–1)	BSU Pavilion (3,911); Boise, ID
January 9, 2003; 7:05 pm		SMU	W 72–55	9–2 (2–1)	Stan Sheriff Center (6,607); Honolulu, HI
January 11, 2003; 7:05 pm		Louisiana Tech	W 57–53	10–2 (3–1)	Stan Sheriff Center (7,706); Honolulu, HI
January 13, 2003; 7:05 pm		Fresno State	W 88–77	11–2 (4–1)	Stan Sheriff Center (8,351); Honolulu, HI
January 18, 2003; 5:00 pm		at San Jose State	L 67–79	11–3 (4–2)	Event Center Arena (1,536); San Jose, CA
January 23, 2003; 5:00 pm		at Fresno State	L 55–56	11–4 (4–3)	Selland Arena (10,220); Fresno, CA
January 25, 2003; 5:05 pm		at Nevada	L 65–73	11–5 (4–4)	Lawlor Events Center (6,846); Reno, NV
January 30, 2003; 7:05 pm		Rice	W 85–70	12–5 (5–4)	Stan Sheriff Center (6,457); Honolulu, HI
February 1, 2003; 7:05 pm		Tulsa	W 73–67 ^{OT}	13–5 (6–4)	Stan Sheriff Center (9,861); Honolulu, HI
February 6, 2003; 3:00 pm		at Louisiana Tech	L 65–66	13–6 (6–5)	Thomas Assembly Center (2,627); Ruston, LA
February 8, 2003; 3:00 pm, Fox Sports Net		at SMU	L 69–78	13–7 (6–6)	Moody Coliseum (4,072); Dallas, TX
February 15, 2003; 7:05 pm		San Jose State	L 54–55	13–8 (6–7)	Stan Sheriff Center (8,113); Honolulu, HI
February 19, 2003; 7:05 pm		Nevada	W 73–71	14–8 (7–7)	Stan Sheriff Center (6,603); Honolulu, HI
February 22, 2003*; 4:30 pm, ESPN2		at Kent State; ESPN BracketBusters	W 79–78	15–8	MAC Center (6,327); Kent, OH
February 27, 2003; 5:00 pm, ESPN2		at Tulsa	L 51–76	15–9 (7–8)	Reynolds Center (8,182); Tulsa, OK
March 1, 2003; 12:00 pm, FSN		at Rice	L 58–75	15–10 (7–9)	Rice Gymnasium (2,018); Houston, TX
March 6, 2003; 7:00 pm		Boise State	W 68–65	16–10 (8–9)	Stan Sheriff Center (6,490); Honolulu, HI
March 8, 2003; 7:00 pm		UTEP	W 77–63	17–10 (9–9)	Stan Sheriff Center (9,562); Honolulu, HI
WAC tournament
March 13, 2003; 2:00 pm	(5)	vs. (4) Rice; WAC Quarterfinals	W 62–61 ^{OT}	18–10	Reynolds Center (4,735); Tulsa, OK
March 14, 2003; 4:30 pm	(5)	at (1) Tulsa; WAC Semifinals	L 56–66	18–11	Reynolds Center (6,134); Tulsa, OK
NIT
March 19, 2003; 7:00 pm, ESPN2		at UNLV; NIT First Round	W 85–68	19–11	Thomas & Mack Center (2,697); Las Vegas, NV
March 24, 2003; 3:00 pm		at Minnesota; NIT Second Round	L 70–84	19–12	Williams Arena (4,311); Minneapolis, MN
*Non-conference game. ^{#}Rankings from AP Poll. (#) Tournament seedings in parentheses. All times are in Hawaiian Time.
