= Josh Jacobs =

American football player (born 1998)

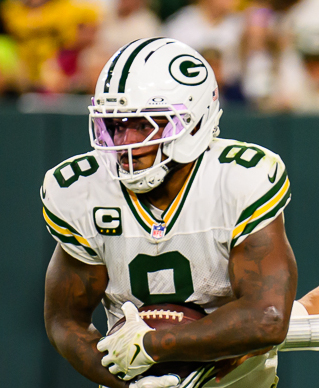
- Jacobs with the Green Bay Packers in 2025

No. 8 – Green Bay Packers
- Position: Running back
- Roster status: Active

Personal information
- Born: February 11, 1998 (age 28); Tulsa, Oklahoma, U.S.
- Listed height: 5 ft 10 in (1.78 m)
- Listed weight: 223 lb (101 kg)

Career information
- High school: McLain (Tulsa)
- College: Alabama (2016–2018)
- NFL draft: 2019: 1st round, 24th overall pick

Career history
- Oakland / Las Vegas Raiders (2019–2023); Green Bay Packers (2024–present)

Awards and highlights
- First-team All-Pro (2022); 3× Pro Bowl (2020, 2022, 2024); NFL rushing yards leader (2022); PFWA All-Rookie Team (2019); CFP national champion (2017)

Career NFL statistics as of Week 10, 2026
- Rushing yards: 7,883
- Rushing average: 4.2
- Rushing touchdowns: 75
- Receptions: 280
- Receiving yards: 2,140
- Receiving touchdowns: 4
- Stats at Pro Football Reference

Joshua Cordell Jacobs (born February 11, 1998) is an American professional football running back for the Green Bay Packers of the National Football League (NFL). He played college football for the Alabama Crimson Tide and was selected by the Oakland Raiders in the first round of the 2019 NFL draft. Jacobs rushed for over 1,000 yards in each of his first two seasons, while being named to NFL All-Rookie Team in 2019 and to his first Pro Bowl in 2020. In 2022, he led the league in rushing yards with 1,653 and became the first Raider since 1985 to surpass 2,000 scrimmage yards. After five years with the Raiders, Jacobs signed with the Packers in 2024.

== Early life ==
Jacobs attended McLain High School in Tulsa, Oklahoma. During his high school football career, he had 5,372 yards and 56 touchdowns for the Titans. He committed to play college football at the University of Alabama.

Jacobs experienced homelessness in middle school. At the end of his rookie season in the NFL, he was featured in a Kia commercial reflecting on his experience with homelessness, which aired during Super Bowl LIV.

== College career ==
As a freshman at Alabama in 2016, Jacobs split time with Damien Harris and Bo Scarbrough, rushing 85 times for 567 yards and four touchdowns. As a sophomore in 2017, he had 284 yards on 46 carries with one touchdown. After the season, it was revealed that he had been playing on a broken ankle for most of the season. As a junior, he was named the MVP of the 2018 SEC Championship Game against the Georgia Bulldogs after rushing for 83 yards with two touchdowns.

== Professional career ==
Pre-draft measurables
Height	Weight	Arm length	Hand span	Wingspan	40-yard dash	10-yard split	20-yard split	Vertical jump	Broad jump	Bench press
5 ft 10 in (1.78 m)	220 lb (100 kg)	31 5/8 in (0.80 m)	10 1/8 in (0.26 m)	6 ft 2 1/4 in (1.89 m)	4.64 s	1.60 s	2.63 s	35.0 in (0.89 m)	9 ft 4 in (2.84 m)	18 reps
All values from NFL Combine/Pro Day

=== Oakland / Las Vegas Raiders ===
==== 2019 season ====
The Oakland Raiders selected Jacobs in the first round with the 24th overall pick in the 2019 NFL draft, a pick that was acquired from the Chicago Bears in the September 2018 Khalil Mack trade. He signed his four-year rookie contract with the team on July 9, 2019.

Jacobs made his NFL debut in Week 1 against the Denver Broncos on Monday Night Football. In the game, Jacobs rushed 23 times for 85 yards and two touchdowns and caught one pass for 28 yards in the 24–16 victory. In the following game against the Kansas City Chiefs, he rushed 12 times for 99 yards as the Raiders lost by a score of 28–10. Three weeks later against the Chicago Bears at Tottenham Hotspur Stadium in London, Jacobs rushed 26 times for 123 yards and two touchdowns and caught three passes for 20 yards in the 24–21 win. One of his touchdowns was the first in the new stadium. During Week 7 against the Green Bay Packers, he rushed 21 times for 124 yards in the 42–24 road loss. Two weeks later against the Detroit Lions, Jacobs rushed 28 times for 120 yards and two touchdowns in the 31–24 victory. After the eighth game of the season, Jacobs set the Raiders rookie record for rushing yards in a season with 740, surpassing Marcus Allen's old record of 697 in a nine-game season. In the next game against the Los Angeles Chargers on Thursday Night Football, Jacobs rushed for 71 yards and the game-winning touchdown and caught five passes for 30 yards. In Week 11 against the Cincinnati Bengals, Jacobs rushed 23 times for 112 yards in the 17–10 win. In Week 13 against the Chiefs, Jacobs rushed 17 times for 104 yards in the 40–9 loss. During the game, he became the first running back in Raiders' history to rush for 1,000 yards in a rookie season, despite missing three of the last four games of the season due to a shoulder injury and skin infection. Jacobs finished the 2019 season with 1,150 rushing yards and seven rushing touchdowns. He was named to the NFL All-Rookie Team, as well as the PFWA Offensive Rookie of the Year. He was ranked 72nd by his fellow players on the NFL Top 100 Players of 2020.

==== 2020 season ====
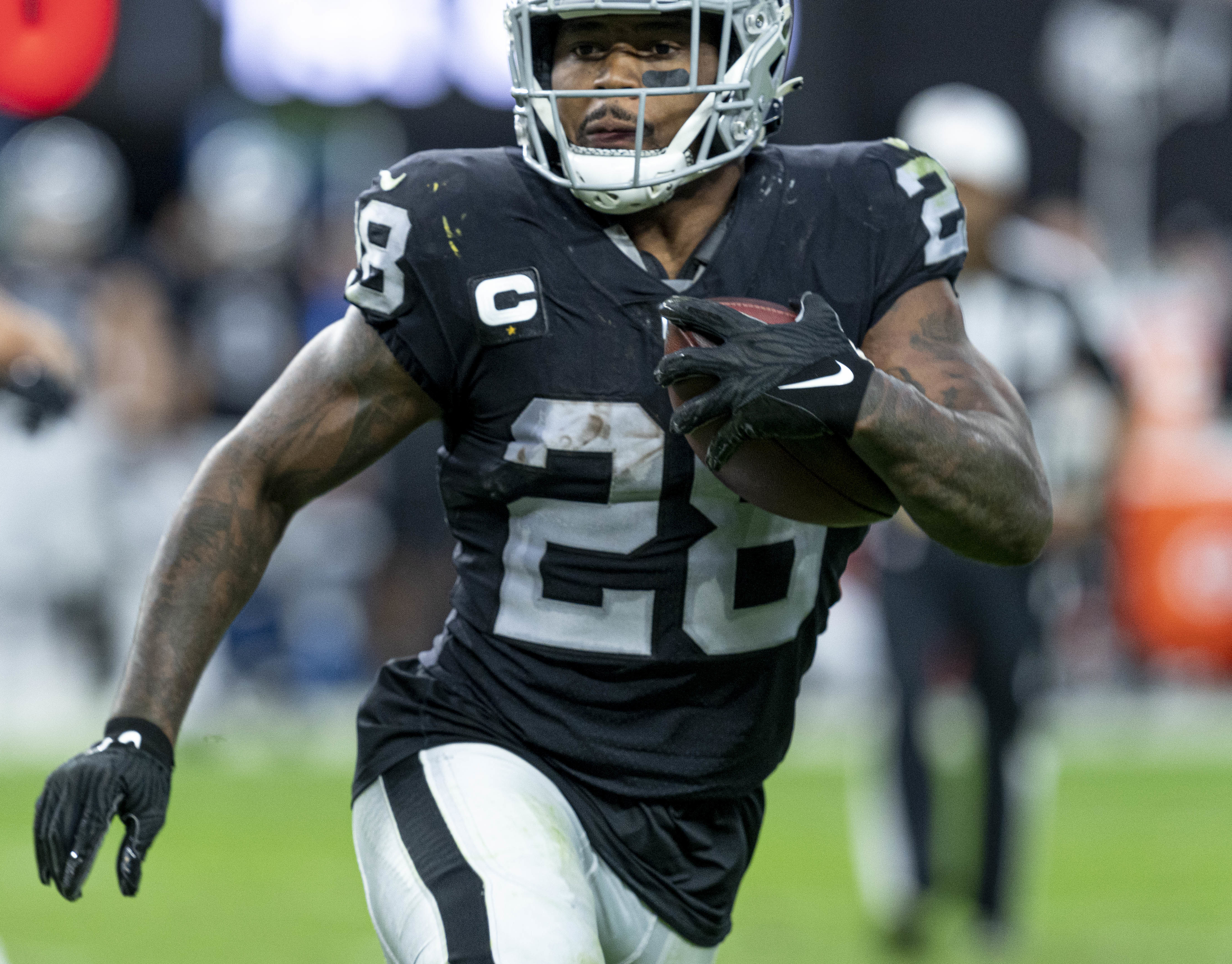
Jacobs playing for the Raiders in 2021.

Jacobs made his return from injury in Week 1 against the Carolina Panthers. During the game, Jacobs rushed 25 times for 93 rushing yards and three rushing touchdowns in the Las Vegas Raiders' 34–30 victory. Jacobs also contributed several key plays in the passing game with 46 yards on four receptions. In the following week's game against the New Orleans Saints on Monday Night Football, Jacobs recorded 105 all purpose yards (88 rushing, 17 receiving) during the 34–24 win. In Week 5 against the Chiefs, Jacobs rushed for 77 yards and two touchdowns in the 40–32 win. In Week 8 against the Cleveland Browns, Jacobs rushed for a career-high 128 yards on 31 carries in the team's 16–6 win. In Week 9 against the Chargers, Jacobs rushed for 65 yards and a rushing touchdown from 14 carries in the team's 31–26 win, making Jacobs the new franchise leader in rushing yards through his first two seasons. In Week 10 against the Broncos, Jacobs rushed 20 times for 112 yards and two rushing touchdowns during the team's 37–12 win. In Week 15 against the Los Angeles Chargers on Thursday Night Football, Jacobs recorded 114 yards from scrimmage and a rushing touchdown during the 30–27 overtime loss. In the 2020 season, Jacobs finished with 273 carries for 1,065 rushing yards and 12 rushing touchdowns to go along with 33 receptions for 238 receiving yards. He was named to the Pro Bowl. He was ranked 68th by his fellow players on the NFL Top 100 Players of 2021.

==== 2021 season ====
Jacobs scored two rushing touchdowns in the Week 1 overtime victory over the Baltimore Ravens. In Week 16, against the Broncos, Jacobs had 27 carries for 129 rushing yards in the 17–13 victory. In Week 18, against the Chargers, he had 26 carries for 132 rushing yards and one rushing touchdown in the 35–32 overtime victory. He finished the 2021 season with 217 carries for 872 rushing yards and nine rushing touchdowns to go along with 54 receptions for 348 receiving yards. In the Wild Card Round, Jacobs had 127 scrimmage yards in the 26–19 loss to the Bengals.

==== 2022 season ====
On April 29, 2022, the Raiders announced that they would not pick up the fifth-year option on Jacobs' contract, making him a free agent in the 2023 offseason. In Week 4, Jacobs set a career high in yardage in a 23–32 win against the Broncos where he ran for 144 yards and two touchdowns. In the following week against the Chiefs, Jacobs ran for a career-high 154 yards on 21 carries in a 30–29 loss. In the next game, against the Houston Texans, he had 20 carries for 143 rushing yards and three rushing touchdowns in the 38–20 victory. In Week 11, against the Broncos, Jacobs had 160 scrimmage yards in the 22–16 victory. The following week against the Seattle Seahawks, Jacobs rushed for 229 yards, and had 74 receiving yards. He finished with a total of 303 scrimmage yards, and two touchdowns in the 40–34 victory, culminating in an 86 yard walk-off touchdown to win the game in overtime. For his performance, Jacobs won AFC Offensive Player of the Week. In the following game, Jacobs had 26 carries for 144 rushing yards and a rushing touchdown in a 27–20 victory over the Chargers. Jacobs was the NFL rushing yards leader with 340 attempts, 1,653 rushing yards, and 12 rushing touchdowns. In addition, he had 53 receptions for 400 receiving yards. He became the first player in franchise history to reach 2,000 scrimmage yards since Marcus Allen in 1985. On February 9, 2023, Josh Jacobs was awarded with the NFLs first Jim Brown Award at the NFL Honors. He was named as a Pro Bowler and first team All-Pro. He was ranked 12th by his fellow players on the NFL Top 100 Players of 2023.

==== 2023 season ====
On March 6, 2023, the Raiders placed the franchise tag on Jacobs. On August 26, Jacobs and the Raiders agreed to a one-year deal worth up to $12 million. In Week 4, Jacobs rushed for 58 yards and one touchdown and caught eight passes for a career-high 81 receiving yards during a loss to the Los Angeles Chargers. In Week 9, Jacobs rushed for 98 yards and two touchdowns during a 30–6 win over the New York Giants. Five days after the game, Jacobs was fined $21,855 for lowering his helmet to initiate contact. He suffered a quad injury, which left him out of the final four games of the 2023 season. He finished the season with 233 carries for 805 rushing yards and six rushing touchdowns to go with 37 receptions for 296 receiving yards.

=== Green Bay Packers ===
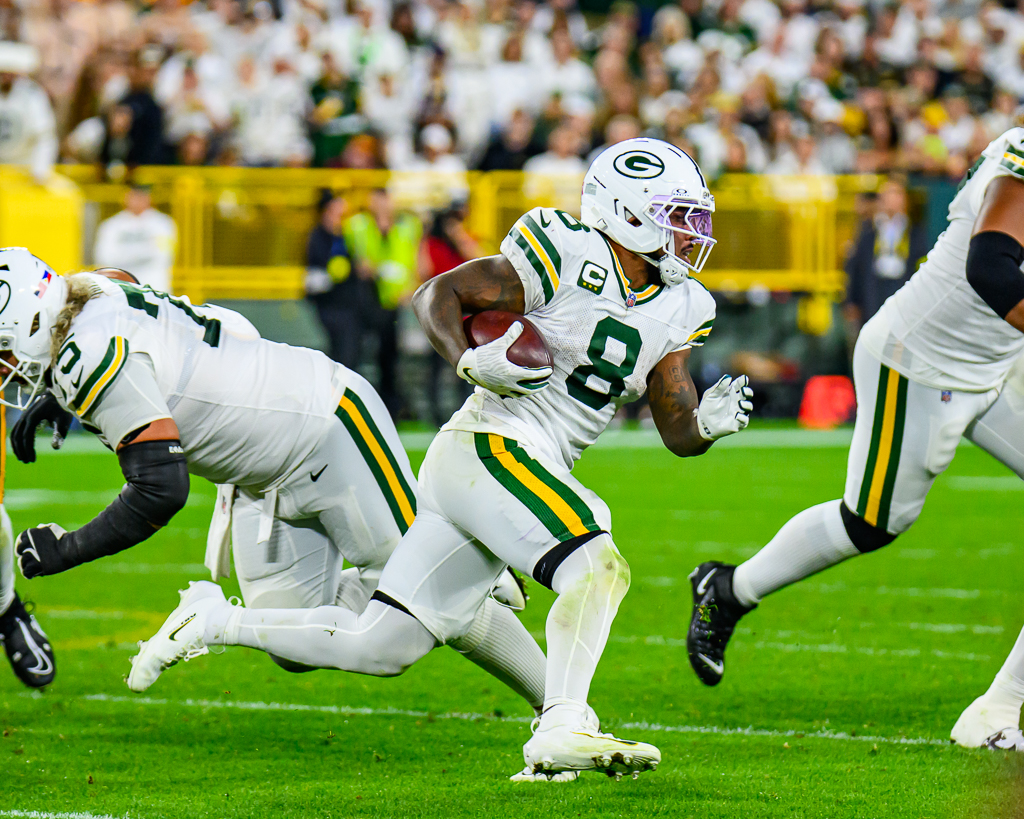
Jacobs with the Green Bay Packers in 2025

==== 2024 season ====
On March 14, 2024, Jacobs signed a four-year, $48 million contract with the Green Bay Packers. In Week 2, against the Colts, he had 32 carries for 151 yards in the 16–10 win. In Week 7, Jacobs rushed for 76 yards, and caught five receptions for 16 yards and his first-career touchdown reception, during a 24–22 victory of the Houston Texans. In Week 8 against the Jaguars, he had 25 carries for 127 yards and two touchdowns in the 30–27 victory. In Week 12 against the 49ers, he had 26 carries for 106 yards and three rushing touchdowns in a 38–10 home win. In Week 14 against the Lions, he had another game with three rushing touchdowns. On January 2, 2025, he was named to the 2025 Pro Bowl Games. In the 2024 season, Jacobs finished with 301 carries for 1,329 rushing yards and a career-high 15 rushing touchdowns to go with 36 receptions for 342 receiving yards and one receiving touchdown. He had 121 scrimmage yards and a rushing touchdown in the 22–10 loss to the Eagles in the Wild Card Round. He was ranked 33rd by his fellow players on the NFL Top 100 Players of 2025.

==== 2025 season ====
From Weeks 4–7, Jacobs had three consecutive games with two rushing touchdowns, with the first two games going over 150 scrimmage yards as well. In the 2025 season, Jacobs finished with 234 carries for 939 rushing yards and 13 rushing touchdowns to go with 36 receptions for 282 receiving yards and one receiving touchdown.

==== 2026 season ====
On August 30, 2026, the NFL placed Jacobs on the Commissioner's Exempt List because of his domestic violence charges, prohibiting him from practicing or playing in games. On October 19, Jacobs was removed from the exempt list and activated by the Packers five days later, having missed six games.

== Career statistics ==
Legend
	Led the league
**Bold**	Career high

=== NFL ===
==== Regular season ====
Year	Team	Games		Rushing					Receiving					Fumbles	
Year	Team	GP	GS	Att	Yds	Avg	Lng	TD	Rec	Yds	Avg	Lng	TD	Fum	Lost
2019	OAK	13	13	242	1,150	4.8	51	7	20	166	8.3	28	0	1	1
2020	LV	15	15	273	1,065	3.9	28	12	33	238	7.2	29	0	2	2
2021	LV	15	14	217	872	4.0	28	9	**54**	348	6.4	29	0	2	2
2022	LV	17	17	**340**	**1,653**	**4.9**	**86**	12	53	**400**	7.5	43	0	3	1
2023	LV	13	13	233	805	3.5	63	6	37	296	8.0	21	0	3	1
2024	GB	17	17	301	1,329	4.4	38	**15**	36	342	**9.5**	**49**	1	**4**	**3**
2025	GB	15	15	234	929	4.0	40	13	36	282	7.8	31	1	3	2
2026	GB	3	3	36	80	2.2	10	1	11	68	6.2	25	**2**	1	0
Career		108	107	1,876	7,883	4.2	86	75	280	2,140	7.6	49	4	19	12
Source: pro-football-reference.com

==== Postseason ====
Year	Team	Games		Rushing					Receiving					Fumbles	
Year	Team	GP	GS	Att	Yds	Avg	Lng	TD	Rec	Yds	Avg	Lng	TD	Fum	Lost
2021	LV	1	1	13	**83**	**6.4**	**35**	0	**4**	**44**	11.0	**15**	0	0	0
2024	GB	1	1	18	81	4.5	31	**1**	3	40	**13.3**	**15**	0	**1**	0
2025	GB	1	1	**19**	55	2.9	13	0	1	3	3.0	3	0	**1**	0
Career		3	3	50	219	4.4	35	1	8	87	10.9	15	0	2	0
Source: pro-football-reference.com

=== College ===
College statistics
Season	Team	GP	Rushing				Receiving				Scrimmage			
Season	Team	GP	Att	Yds	Avg	TD	Rec	Yds	Avg	TD	Plays	Yds	Avg	TD
2016	Alabama	14	85	567	**6.7**	4	14	156	11.1	0	99	723	7.3	4
2017	Alabama	11	46	284	6.2	1	14	168	12.0	2	60	452	**7.5**	3
2018	Alabama	15	**120**	**640**	5.3	**11**	**20**	**247**	**12.4**	**3**	**140**	**887**	6.3	**14**
Career		40	251	1,491	5.9	16	48	571	11.9	5	299	2,062	6.9	21
Source: sports-reference.com

== Personal life ==
Jacobs is of Filipino descent through his paternal grandmother, a native of Angeles City. He has a portrait of her tattooed on his left hand. He plays with the Philippine-flag stickered onto his helmet and has a tattoo of the Philippines' eight-rayed golden-yellow sun on his left biceps.

Jacobs' younger brother, Isaiah Jacobs, played running back for the UAB Blazers from 2020 to 2025.

On May 26, 2026, Jacobs was arrested by the Hobart-Lawrence Police Department in Brown County, Wisconsin, stemming from an incident on May 23. He was booked on five domestic battery-related charges. On May 27, Jacobs was released from jail with the investigation remaining pending.
