= Dana Lewis (basketball) =

American basketball player (born 1949)

Personal information
- Born: October 16, 1949 (age 77) Newark, New Jersey, U.S.
- Listed height: 6 ft 10 in (2.08 m)
- Listed weight: 240 lb (109 kg)

Career information
- High school: Weequahic (Newark, New Jersey)
- College: Oral Roberts (1967–1968); Tulsa (1969–1971)
- NBA draft: 1971: 1st round, 12th overall pick
- Drafted by: Philadelphia 76ers
- Playing career: 1971–1979
- Position: Center
- Number: 15

Career history
- 1971–1974: Hartford Capitols
- 1974–1975: Cherry Hill Pros
- 1976–1979: Presto Ice Cream / N-Rich Coffee Creamers / Great Taste Discoverers

Career highlights
- EBA champion (1974); All-EBA Second Team (1973); Second-team Parade All-American (1967)
- Stats at Basketball Reference

Dana Lewis (born October 16, 1949) is an American former professional basketball player. He played college basketball for the Oral Roberts Golden Eagles and Tulsa Golden Hurricane. Lewis was selected as the 12th overall pick in the 1971 NBA draft by the Philadelphia 76ers but spent his professional career in the Eastern Basketball Association (EBA) and the Philippines.

== Early life ==
In 1966, Dana Lewis moved with his mother from New York City to Newark, New Jersey. He attended Weequahic High School in Newark. There he played basketball and was a teammate of future NBA player Mo Layton in a highly successful program. In 1966–1967 Weequahic went undefeated and won the Group 4 State Championship, defending their title from the year before.

Weequahic High School in 1965–66 and 1966–67 had each of the five starters go on to play college basketball. Two reached the National Basketball Association. The five were Layton, Lewis, Leroy Cobb, George Watson and Bill Mainor. Layton played with Phoenix and Portland in the NBA after a college career at the University of Southern California. Mainor played at Fordham, and Cobb and Watson played at Southern California with Layton.

“Yes, that was quite a ballclub,” reminisced Les Fein, the Weequahic coach. “Not only were the boys excellent players, but they were gentlemen.”

== College career ==
Following his high school career, Lewis was heavily recruited. The Associated Press release on April 19, 1967, read as follows: "NEWARK, N.J. (AP) Dana Lewis, Wcequahic High School's 6-foot-10 All-America basketball player, rejected the recruiting efforts of virtually every major college in the country and announced that he will attend Oral Roberts University in Tulsa, Okla., for religious reasons. Oral Roberts, which is only two years old, is named after and administered by the world-famed evangelist, acknowledged spiritual leader of the Pentecostal Church, to' which Lewis' family belongs. Lewis led Weequahic to 40 straight victories and two New Jersey State championships."

As a 6’10" Center playing for Oral Roberts University in Tulsa, Oklahoma as a freshman, Lewis averaged 16.0 points and 10.2 rebounds in 24 games. Lewis' mother had influenced him to attend Oral Roberts University for his first collegiate season, and after one season he wished to transfer. Deciding to stay in town and transfer to the University of Tulsa, Lewis needed a release from ORU to be eligible. While awaiting a release, Lewis stayed in Tulsa and got a job hauling hay. He eventually paid his own tuition the first semester at Tulsa by working a construction job. Finally, Oral Roberts himself wrote a handwritten release for Lewis to be able to play for Tulsa.

At Tulsa, Lewis averaged 20.3 points and 11.9 bounds in 1969–1970 and 23.3 points and 13.5 rebounds in 1970–1971, while playing under coach Ken Hayes. In 1970, Lewis was named the "Missouri Valley Conference Newcomer of the Year.". In 1970–1971, Lewis led the Missouri Valley Conference in scoring and was First-Team All-MVC in both Tulsa seasons. Lewis still holds the Tulsa record for Rebounds in a game with 26, vs. MacMurray College, on Dec. 27, 1969.

Overall, in 52 games for Tulsa, Lewis averaged a double-double of 21.8 points and 12.7 rebounds over his two seasons.

After graduating from Tulsa, Lewis was selected for the World University Games, where Team USA earned a bronze medal, losing to USSR in the final. George McGinnis was a teammate on the USA team.

== Professional career ==
Lewis was drafted in the 1st Round (12th overall) of the 1971 NBA draft by the Philadelphia 76ers on May 9, 1971. Lewis was also drafted by the Virginia Squires in the 1971 ABA Draft. He chose to sign with the 76ers. Originally signing a 6-year $500,000 mostly guaranteed contract, Lewis was cut by the 76ers on Sept. 27, 1972 after the third game of the season, before appearing in an NBA game.

Lewis went on to play four seasons in the Eastern Basketball Association (EBA). He played for the Hartford Capitols (1971–1974) and the Cherry Hill Pros (1974–1975). The Capitols won the League title in 1973–1974 as Lewis averaged 12.3 points and 15.3 rebounds. He was selected to the All-EBA Second Team in 1973.

Later, Lewis played in the Philippine Basketball Association as an "import" for Presto and Great Taste Coffee Makers teams from 1976 to 1979.

== Honors ==
Lewis was inducted into the University of Tulsa Athletics Hall of Fame in 2019.
