= 1983–84 Tulsa Golden Hurricane men's basketball team =

American college basketball season

1983–84 Tulsa Golden Hurricane men's basketball

MVC Regular Season co-champion MVC tournament champion

NCAA tournament
- Conference: Missouri Valley Conference

Ranking
- Coaches: No. 12
- AP: No. 12
- Record: 27–4 (13–3 MVC)
- Head coach: Nolan Richardson (4th season)
- Assistant coaches: Scott Edgar (4th season); Al Grushkin; Rob Spivery
- Home arena: Tulsa Convention Center

1983–84 Missouri Valley Conference men's basketball standings
	Conf.				Overall
Team	W		L	PCT	W		L	PCT
Illinois State	13	–	3	.813	23	–	8	.742
No. 12 Tulsa †	13	–	3	.813	27	–	4	.871
Wichita State	11	–	5	.688	18	–	12	.600
Creighton	8	–	8	.500	17	–	14	.548
Bradley	7	–	9	.438	15	–	13	.536
Southern Illinois	7	–	9	.438	15	–	13	.536
Indiana State	6	–	10	.375	14	–	14	.500
Drake	4	–	12	.250	8	–	20	.286
West Texas State	3	–	13	.188	8	–	19	.296
† 1984 MVC tournament winner Rankings from AP Poll

The 1983–84 Tulsa Golden Hurricane men's basketball team represented the University of Tulsa as a member of the Missouri Valley Conference during the 1983–84 college basketball season. The Golden Hurricane played their home games at the Tulsa Convention Center. Led by head coach Nolan Richardson, they finished the season 27–4 overall and 13–3 in conference play to finish tied atop the MVC standings. The Golden Hurricane won the MVC tournament to receive an automatic bid to the NCAA tournament as the No. 4 seed in the Mideast region. Tulsa lost to No. 5 seed Louisville in the round of 32.

== Roster ==
1983–84 Tulsa Golden Hurricane men's basketball team
Players
Coaches

Pos.	#	Name	Height	Weight	Year	Hometown
G		Carlton McKinney	6 ft 4 in (1.93 m)	—	Fr
G	20	Steve Harris	6 ft 5 in (1.96 m)	190 lb (86 kg)	Jr	Kansas City, Missouri
G	21	Byron Boudreaux	6 ft 4 in (1.93 m)	—	Fr
G	24	Ricky Ross	6 ft 7 in (2.01 m)	—	Sr
F/C	41	Herb Johnson	6 ft 10 in (2.08 m)	—	Jr

Head coach

Nolan Richardson

Assistant coach(es)

Legend

- (C) Team captain
- (S) Suspended
- (I) Ineligible
- (W) Walk-on
- Injured
- Current redshirt

== Schedule and results ==
Date time, TV	Rank^{#}	Opponent^{#}	Result	Record	Site (attendance) city, state
Regular season
Nov 26, 1983*		College of the Ozarks	W 98–74	1–0	Tulsa Convention Center (6,814); Tulsa, Oklahoma
Dec 1, 1983*		Oral Roberts	W 87–81	2–0	Tulsa Convention Center (8,927); Tulsa, Oklahoma
Dec 3, 1983*		Alabama State	W 79–72	3–0	Tulsa Convention Center (8,335); Tulsa, Oklahoma
Dec 9, 1983*		Long Island; Golden Hurricane Classic	W 126–80	4–0	Tulsa Convention Center (8,714); Tulsa, Oklahoma
Dec 10, 1983*		San Diego State; Golden Hurricane Classic	W 91–80	5–0	Tulsa Convention Center (8,720); Tulsa, Oklahoma
Dec 17, 1983*		at Oklahoma State	W 91–79	6–0	Gallagher-Iba Arena (6,100); Stillwater, Oklahoma
Dec 20, 1983*		Oklahoma Baptist	W 95–65	7–0	Tulsa Convention Center (7,926); Tulsa, Oklahoma
Dec 23, 1983*		Missouri–Kansas City	W 104–76	8–0	Tulsa Convention Center (8,173); Tulsa, Oklahoma
Dec 27, 1983*		Pepperdine	W 102–70	9–0	Tulsa Convention Center (9,082); Tulsa, Oklahoma
Dec 31, 1983*		Southern	W 70–68	10–0	Tulsa Convention Center (8,784); Tulsa, Oklahoma
Jan 2, 1984		West Texas State	W 121–82	11–0 (1–0)	Tulsa Convention Center (8,237); Tulsa, Oklahoma
Jan 5, 1984		at Drake	W 91–79	12–0 (2–0)	Veterans Memorial Auditorium (5,190); Des Moines, Iowa
Jan 7, 1984		Bradley	W 82–69	13–0 (3–0)	Tulsa Convention Center (9,200); Tulsa, Oklahoma
Jan 12, 1984*	No. 20	at Oral Roberts	W 84–78	14–0	Mabee Center (10,575); Tulsa, Oklahoma
Jan 14, 1984	No. 20	at West Texas A&M	W 99–93	15–0 (4–0)	WT Fieldhouse (2,372); Canyon, Texas
Jan 19, 1984	No. 13	Illinois State	L 73–79	15–1 (4–1)	Tulsa Convention Center (9,200); Tulsa, Oklahoma
Jan 21, 1984	No. 13	at Bradley	W 80–66	13–1 (5–1)	Carver Arena (10,000); Peoria, Illinois
Jan 26, 1984	No. 12	Creighton	W 75–64	17–1 (6–1)	Tulsa Convention Center (9,200); Tulsa, Oklahoma
Feb 2, 1984	No. 11	at Wichita State	L 64–66	17–2 (6–2)	Levitt Arena (10,666); Wichita, Kansas
Feb 4, 1984	No. 11	Drake	W 93–74	18–2 (7–2)	Tulsa Convention Center (9,200); Tulsa, Oklahoma
Feb 9, 1984	No. 12	at Indiana State	W 87–70	19–2 (8–2)	Hulman Center (6,000); Terre Haute, Indiana
Feb 11, 1984	No. 12	at Southern Illinois	W 86–76	20–2 (9–2)	SIU Arena (6,375); Carbondale, Illinois
Feb 16, 1984	No. 12	at Creighton	W 82–80	21–2 (10–2)	Omaha Civic Auditorium (6,490); Omaha, Nebraska
Feb 18, 1984	No. 12	Wichita State	W 105–97	22–2 (11–2)	Tulsa Convention Center (9,200); Tulsa, Oklahoma
Feb 25, 1984	No. 10	Southern Illinois	W 111–90	23–2 (12–2)	Tulsa Convention Center (9,200); Tulsa, Oklahoma
Mar 1, 1984	No. 9	Indiana State	W 126–102	24–2 (13–2)	Tulsa Convention Center (9,200); Tulsa, Oklahoma
Mar 3, 1984	No. 9	at Illinois State	L 81–91	24–3 (13–3)	Horton Field House (7,801); Normal, Illinois
MVC Tournament
Mar 8, 1984*	No. 12	Indiana State; Quarterfinals	W 110–99	25–3	Tulsa Convention Center (8,168); Tulsa, Oklahoma
Mar 9, 1984*	No. 12	Wichita State; Semifinals	W 86–80	26–3	Tulsa Convention Center (9,047); Tulsa, Oklahoma
Mar 10, 1984*	No. 12	Creighton; Championship game	W 70–68 ^{OT}	27–3	Tulsa Convention Center (9,021); Tulsa, Oklahoma
NCAA Tournament
Mar 18, 1984*	(4 ME) No. 12	vs. (5 ME) Louisville; Second round	L 67–69	27–4	MECCA Arena (10,788); Milwaukee, Wisconsin
*Non-conference game. ^{#}Rankings from AP. (#) Tournament seedings in parentheses. ME=Mideast. All times are in Central.
