= 1984 Missouri Valley Conference men's basketball tournament =

- Classification: Division I
- Season: 1983–84
- Teams: 8
- Site: Campus sites
- Finals site: Tulsa Convention Center; Tulsa, Oklahoma
- Champions: Tulsa (2nd title)
- Winning coach: Nolan Richardson (2nd title)

1983–84 Missouri Valley Conference men's basketball standings
	Conf.				Overall
Team	W		L	PCT	W		L	PCT
Illinois State	13	–	3	.813	23	–	8	.742
No. 12 Tulsa †	13	–	3	.813	27	–	4	.871
Wichita State	11	–	5	.688	18	–	12	.600
Creighton	8	–	8	.500	17	–	14	.548
Bradley	7	–	9	.438	15	–	13	.536
Southern Illinois	7	–	9	.438	15	–	13	.536
Indiana State	6	–	10	.375	14	–	14	.500
Drake	4	–	12	.250	8	–	20	.286
West Texas State	3	–	13	.188	8	–	19	.296
† 1984 MVC tournament winner Rankings from AP Poll

The 1984 Missouri Valley Conference men's basketball tournament was played after the conclusion of the 1983–1984 regular season. The quarterfinal and semifinal rounds were played on campus sites with the final contested at the Tulsa Convention Center in Tulsa, Oklahoma.

The twelfth ranked Tulsa Golden Hurricane defeated the Creighton Bluejays in the championship game, 70-68, and as a result won their 2nd MVC Tournament title and earned an automatic bid to the 1984 NCAA tournament.

== Bracket ==
Quarterfinals; March 8, 1984; Campus Sites
1	Illinois State	91
8	Drake	62
4	Creighton	50
5	Bradley	40
2	No. 12 Tulsa	110
7	Indiana State	99
3	Wichita State	107
6	Southern Illinois	77

Semifinals; March 9, 1984; Campus Sites
1	Illinois State	59
4	Creighton	69
2	No. 12 Tulsa	86
3	Wichita State	80

Final; March 10, 1984; Tulsa Convention Center
4	Creighton	68^{OT}
2	No. 12 Tulsa	70
