= Steve Bracey =

American basketball player (1950–2006)

Personal information
- Born: August 1, 1950 Brooklyn, New York, U.S.
- Died: February 14, 2006 (aged 55)
- Listed height: 6 ft 1 in (1.85 m)
- Listed weight: 175 lb (79 kg)

Career information
- High school: Midwood (Brooklyn, New York)
- College: Kilgore (1968–1970); Tulsa (1970–1972)
- NBA draft: 1972: 2nd round, 21st overall pick
- Drafted by: Atlanta Hawks
- Playing career: 1972–1975
- Position: Point guard
- Number: 20, 22

Career history
- 1972–1974: Atlanta Hawks
- 1974–1975: Golden State Warriors

Career highlights
- NBA champion (1975); Honorable mention All-American (1972); First-team All-MVC (1972); First-team NJCAA All-American (1970)

Career statistics
- Points: 1,141 (6.1 ppg)
- Rebounds: 291 (1.6 rpg)
- Assists: 408 (2.2 apg)
- Stats at NBA.com
- Stats at Basketball Reference

Stephen Henry Bracey (August 1, 1950 – February 14, 2006) was an American National Basketball Association (NBA) basketball point guard and shooting guard.

Bracey initially attended Kilgore Junior College, where in his sophomore year in 1969–70 he was the nation's top junior college scorer at 33.4 points per game. He was named to the 1969–70 All-American Junior College First Team, and later inducted into Kilgore's Athletic Hall of Fame.

Bracey transferred to the University of Tulsa as a junior, and in his senior season in 1971–72 he averaged 24.1 points (2nd in the Missouri Valley Conference), and in one game scored 47 points against Drake University. He was named to the 1971–72 All-Missouri Valley Conference First Team, as well as an honorable mention All-American, and was later inducted into the University of Tulsa Athletic Hall of Fame.

Bracey was the 21st overall pick in the 1972 NBA draft by the Atlanta Hawks. He played in the NBA, first for two season with the Hawks. He then played for one season with the Golden State Warriors, which whom he was an NBA Champion in 1975.

== Early life ==
Steve Bracey grew up in Crown Heights, Brooklyn, in the Kingsborough Houses. He attended Midwood High School ('68). He played point guard for the Midwood High School basketball team coached by Bob Coccodrilli, and the team was runner-up to Tilden High School's basketball team in 1967 for the New York City High School Basketball Championship.The following 67-68 season, Bracey led Midwood to the city championship over Tilden at Madison Square Garden.

== College ==
=== Kilgore Junior College ===
A 6' 1" guard, Bracey attended Kilgore Junior College in Texas for two years. In his sophomore year in 1969–70 he averaged 33.4 points per game over 29 games for the Rangers, and was the top junior college scorer. He was named to the 1969–70 All-American First Team Junior College Team, along with among others fellow future NBA player Paul Stovall.

Bracey was inducted into Kilgore's Athletic Hall of Fame in 2003.

=== University of Tulsa ===
Bracey transferred to the University of Tulsa as a junior for the 1970-71 season, where he averaged 21.3 points and 4.9 rebounds in his two-year career, playing for the school's Golden Hurricane basketball team.

In 1970–71 as a junior he averaged 19.4 points (8th in the Missouri Valley Conference) and 5.0 rebounds over 25 games.

In 1971–72, as a senior, Bracey averaged 24.1 points (2nd in the Missouri Valley Conference, behind John Williamson) and 4.7 rebounds, while shooting 47% from the floor, over 26 games. He had four games in which he scored 34 or more points, including one in which he scored 47 points against Drake University; as of 2004 that was the third-highest scoring game of any Tulsa player ever. He was named to the 1971–72 All-Missouri Valley Conference First Team, as well as an honorable mention All-American.

Bracey was inducted into the University of Tulsa Athletic Hall of Fame in 2000.

== NBA ==
=== Atlanta Hawks ===
Bracey was the 21st overall pick in the 1972 NBA draft by the Atlanta Hawks in April 1972, and signed a multi-year contract with the team. He played three seasons (1972–75) in the National Basketball Association, two seasons as a member of the Atlanta Hawks.

In 1972–73, at 22 years of age, he averaged 15.0 minutes, 6.5 points, 1.8 assists, and 1.5 rebounds per game while shooting 48% from the field in 70 games alongside Pete Maravich. On January 5, 1973, Bracey scored 25 points versus the Boston Celtics. He matched his 25 point career high the following season on November 27, 1974 versus Nate Tiny Archibald and the Kansas City - Omaha Kings. In the 72-73 playoffs, against Boston, Bracey averaged 20.5 minutes, 9.8 points, 3.3 assists, and 2.2 rebounds per game while shooting 51% from the field in 6 games in the Eastern Conference Semifinals.

In 1973–74, Bracey averaged 19.5 minutes, 7.3 points, 3.1 assists, and 1.9 rebounds per game while shooting 46% from the field in 75 games, again alongside Pete Maravich. He was 13th in the NBA with 5.7 assists per 36 minutes, and 14th in the NBA with 6.8 assists per 100 possessions.

=== Golden State Warriors; NBA champion ===
In September 1972, the Golden State Warriors traded for him, and he played one season with the team. In 1974–75, Bracey averaged 8.1 minutes, 3.2 points, 1.2 assists, and 0.9 rebounds per game in 42 games, as Rick Barry and Jamaal Wilkes played at the forward position. In the playoffs, he averaged 3.5 minutes, 2.5 points, and 0.8 assists per game, as he sank all four of his foul shots, in 4 games. Bracey won an NBA Championship with Golden State in 1975. In July 1975, he became a free agent.

== Later life ==
Bracey was a transportation company executive in 2005. He died from diabetes-related complications in 2006, at the age of 55.

== NBA career statistics ==
Legend
GP	Games played	GS	Games started	MPG	Minutes per game
FG%	Field goal percentage	3P%	3-point field goal percentage	FT%	Free throw percentage
RPG	Rebounds per game	APG	Assists per game	SPG	Steals per game
BPG	Blocks per game	PPG	Points per game	**Bold**	Career high
†	Won an NBA championship

=== Regular season ===
Year	Team	GP	GS	MPG	FG%	3P%	FT%	RPG	APG	SPG	BPG	PPG
1972–73	Atlanta	70	-	15.0	**.486**	-	.664	1.5	1.8	-	-	6.5
1973–74	Atlanta	**75**	-	**19.5**	.463	-	**.719**	**1.9**	**3.1**	**0.8**	**0.1**	**7.3**
1974–75†	Golden State	42	-	8.1	.415	-	.658	0.9	1.2	0.3	0.0	3.2
Career		187	-	15.3	.466	-	.684	1.6	2.2	0.6	0.1	6.1

=== Playoffs ===
Year	Team	GP	GS	MPG	FG%	3P%	FT%	RPG	APG	SPG	BPG	PPG
1972–73	Atlanta	**6**	-	**20.5**	**.511**	-	.688	**2.2**	**3.3**	-	-	**9.8**
1974–75†	Golden State	4	-	3.5	.429	-	**1.000**	0.3	0.8	**0.8**	0.0	2.5
Career		10	-	13.7	.500	-	.750	1.4	2.3	0.8	0.0	6.9

== See also ==
- Tulsa Golden Hurricane men's basketball statistical leaders
