= 2003 WAC men's basketball tournament =

- Classification: Division I
- Season: 2002–03
- Teams: 9
- Site: Reynolds Center; Tulsa, Oklahoma
- Champions: Tulsa (1st title)
- MVP: Kevin Johnson (Tulsa)

2002–03 WAC men's basketball standings
	Conf.				Overall
Team	W		L	PCT	W		L	PCT
Fresno State	13	–	5	.722	20	–	8	.714
Tulsa †	12	–	6	.667	23	–	10	.697
SMU	11	–	7	.611	17	–	13	.567
Nevada	11	–	7	.611	18	–	14	.563
Rice	11	–	7	.611	19	–	10	.655
Hawaii	9	–	9	.500	19	–	12	.613
Louisiana Tech	9	–	9	.500	12	–	15	.444
Boise State	7	–	11	.389	13	–	16	.448
San Jose State	4	–	14	.222	7	–	21	.250
UTEP	3	–	15	.167	6	–	24	.200
† 2003 WAC tournament winner

The 2003 WAC men's basketball tournament was held in the Reynolds Center in Tulsa, Oklahoma. The winners of the tournament were the top seed, Tulsa.

== Bracket ==
Play-in Game
9	UTEP	86
8	San Jose State	80

Quarter-finals
1	Tulsa	81
9	UTEP	47
5	Hawaii	62
4	Rice	61^{OT}
3	Nevada	72
6	Louisiana Tech	66
2	SMU	65
7	Boise State	58

Semi-finals
1	Tulsa	66
5	Hawaii	56
3	Nevada	81
2	SMU	66

Final
1	Tulsa	75
3	Nevada	64
