= Ken Smith (basketball, born 1953) =

American basketball player

Personal information
- Born: July 12, 1953 (age 73)
- Listed height: 6 ft 7 in (2.01 m)
- Listed weight: 185 lb (84 kg)

Career information
- High school: South Oak Cliff (Dallas, Texas)
- College: Lon Morris (1971–1973); Tulsa (1973–1975)
- NBA draft: 1975: 4th round, 65th overall pick
- Drafted by: Houston Rockets
- Position: Small forward
- Number: 52

Career history
- 1975–1976: San Antonio Spurs
- Stats at Basketball Reference

Kenneth Wayne Smith (born July 12, 1953) is an American former professional basketball player. He played in the American Basketball Association for the San Antonio Spurs at the beginning of the 1975–76 season.
