= Shea Seals =

American basketball player and coach

Personal information
- Born: August 26, 1975 (age 51) Tulsa, Oklahoma, U.S.
- Listed height: 6 ft 5 in (1.96 m)
- Listed weight: 210 lb (95 kg)

Career information
- High school: McLain (Tulsa, Oklahoma)
- College: Tulsa (1993–1997)
- NBA draft: 1997: undrafted
- Playing career: 1997–2004
- Position: Shooting guard
- Number: 24
- Coaching career: 2004–2022

Career history

Playing
- 1997–1998: Los Angeles Lakers
- 1999–2000: ASVEL Basket
- 2002–2003: Mobile Revelers
- 2004–2004: Shandong Lions

Coaching
- 2004–2005: McLain HS (assistant)
- 2005–2007: McLain HS
- 2007–2012: Booker T. Washington HS
- 2015–2022: Tulsa (assistant)

Career highlights
- Third-team All-American – AP, NABC (1997); First-team All-WAC (1997); 2× First-team All-MVC (1995, 1996); No. 21 retired by Tulsa Golden Hurricane
- Stats at NBA.com
- Stats at Basketball Reference

Shea Brandon Seals (born August 26, 1975) is an American former professional basketball player. He played in four games during the 1997–98 NBA season as a shooting guard for the Los Angeles Lakers of the National Basketball Association (NBA).

Seals, who played collegiately for the Tulsa Golden Hurricane men's basketball team and is still their all-time career scoring leader, also played in the ABA with the Indiana Legends and the Kansas City Knights, in the NBDL with the Mobile Revelers, and professionally in France with Villeurbanne and Chalon-sur-Saône. The Tulsa Golden Hurricane have retired Seals' number (#21). He served eight years as the head basketball coach at Booker T. Washington High School in Tulsa, Oklahoma.

He is probably best remembered for his performance against Dream Team III on July 6, 1996, the first exhibition game prior to the 1996 Summer Olympics in Atlanta, Dream Team III won the Gold. He scored 20 points, leading all players on both squads, for his Collegiate All-Star team. Despite his amazing game which helped the College Stars build a 17-point lead at the half, Dream Team III managed to win 96–90.
