= Michael Ruffin =

American basketball player (born 1977)

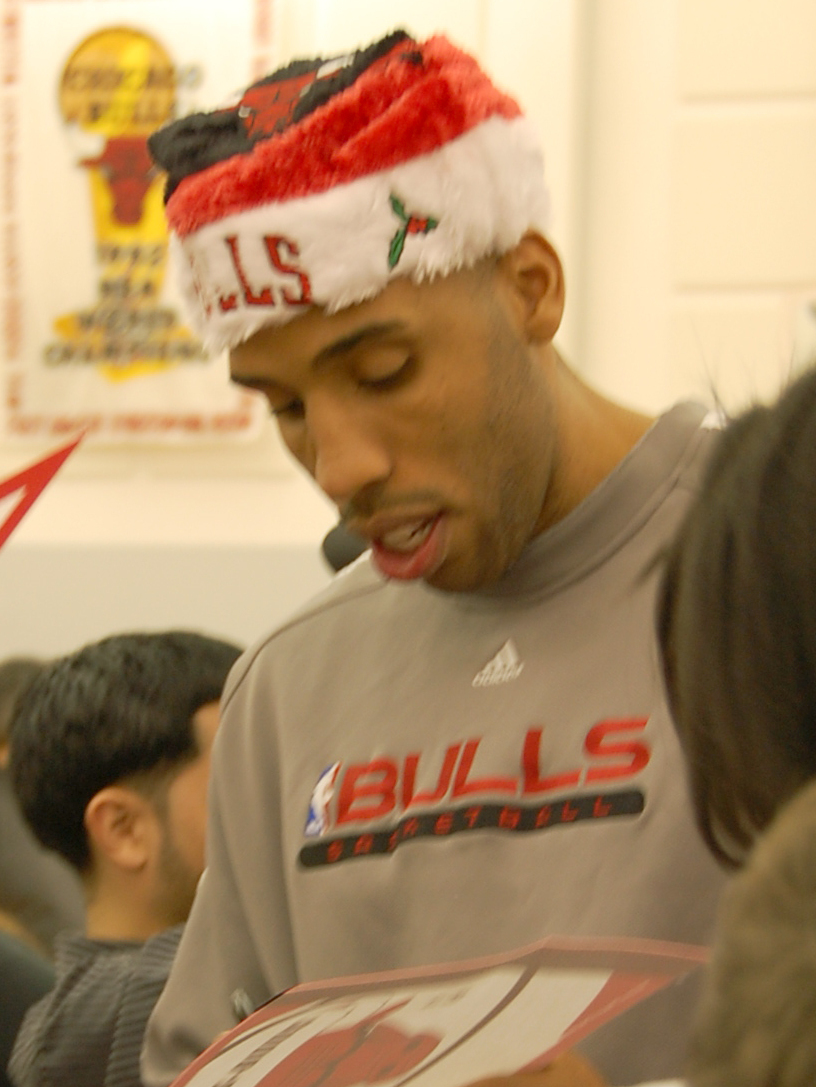
- Ruffin with the Chicago Bulls in 2008

Personal information
- Born: January 21, 1977 (age 49) Denver, Colorado, U.S.
- Listed height: 6 ft 9 in (2.06 m)
- Listed weight: 246 lb (112 kg)

Career information
- High school: Cherry Creek (Englewood, Colorado)
- College: Tulsa (1995–1999)
- NBA draft: 1999: 2nd round, 32nd overall pick
- Drafted by: Chicago Bulls
- Playing career: 1999–2011
- Position: Power forward / center
- Number: 51
- Coaching career: 2014–present

Career history

Playing
- 1999–2001: Chicago Bulls
- 2001–2002: Philadelphia 76ers
- 2002–2003: Caprabo Lleida
- 2003–2004: Utah Jazz
- 2004–2007: Washington Wizards
- 2007–2008: Milwaukee Bucks
- 2009: Portland Trail Blazers
- 2010–2011: Obradoiro CAB

Coaching
- 2014–2020: New Orleans Pelicans (assistant)
- 2021: Fort Wayne Mad Ants (assistant)
- 2021–2023: Phoenix Suns (assistant)

Career highlights
- First-team All-WAC (1998)

Career statistics
- Points: 716 (1.7 ppg)
- Rebounds: 1632 (3.9 rpg)
- Personal fouls: 942 (2.3 pfpg)
- Stats at NBA.com
- Stats at Basketball Reference
Medals
Men's basketball
Representing United States
Summer Universiade
Gold medal – first place	1997 Trapani	National team

Michael David Ruffin (born January 21, 1977) is an American former professional basketball player who played nine seasons in the National Basketball Association (NBA). At 6'8" and 248 lbs, he played as a power forward/center.

== Basketball career ==
After playing college basketball for the Tulsa Golden Hurricane, where he studied chemical engineering, Ruffin was drafted in the second round of the 1999 NBA draft by the Chicago Bulls. He has played for the Bulls, the Philadelphia 76ers, the Utah Jazz, the Washington Wizards, the Milwaukee Bucks, and the Portland Trail Blazers. He averaged 1.7 points and 3.9 rebounds per game through his NBA career and is considered to be a defensive presence on the court. Ruffin's best statistical season came with the 2000-01 Bulls, where tallied career best averages in rebounding (5.8) and scoring (2.6).

On March 30, 2007, Ruffin was part of a dubious blooper that indirectly cost the Wizards a game. Up 109–106 on the Toronto Raptors, with less than four seconds remaining in regulation, Ruffin intercepted an inbound pass. In an attempt to run the clock out, Ruffin tossed the ball in the air, but it landed in the hands of Toronto's Morris Peterson, who sank a game-tying three-pointer as time expired. Forced into overtime, Washington lost the game 123–118.

On February 17, 2009, Ruffin was sent to the Sacramento Kings and then to the Portland Trail Blazers for Ike Diogu shortly thereafter in a 3-team trade.

In 2010, Ruffin became coach of the ABA's Colorado Kings. However, he resumed his career in Spain playing for Obradoiro CAB.

After two years out of the NBA, Ruffin was signed by the league's Denver Nuggets in mid-December 2011. However, he did not make the team's opening day roster.

== Post-NBA career ==
As of 2012, Ruffin was living in Phoenix, Arizona, working for ASQ and coaching basketball.

Ruffin joined the New Orleans Pelicans as player development coach in October 2014.

In January 2021, Ruffin became an assistant coach for the Fort Wayne Mad Ants of the NBA G League.

On September 24, 2021, Ruffin joined the Phoenix Suns as an assistant coach.

== NBA career statistics ==
Legend
GP	Games played	GS	Games started	MPG	Minutes per game
FG%	Field goal percentage	3P%	3-point field goal percentage	FT%	Free throw percentage
RPG	Rebounds per game	APG	Assists per game	SPG	Steals per game
BPG	Blocks per game	PPG	Points per game	**Bold**	Career high

=== Regular season ===
Year	Team	GP	GS	MPG	FG%	3P%	FT%	RPG	APG	SPG	BPG	PPG
1999–00	Chicago	71	6	13.7	.420	.000	.489	3.5	.6	.4	.4	2.2
2000–01	Chicago	45	16	**19.5**	**.444**	.000	.506	**5.5**	0.9	.6	**.8**	**2.6**
2001–02	Philadelphia	15	0	11.3	.269	.000	.250	3.4	.3	.3	.5	1.1
2003–04	Utah	41	**23**	17.9	.325	.000	.421	5.0	**1.0**	.5	.5	2.2
2004–05	Washington	**79**	7	16.0	.414	.000	.433	4.2	.8	.5	.5	1.4
2005–06	Washington	76	4	13.3	.442	.000	.500	3.6	.4	.4	.4	1.4
2006–07	Washington	30	0	9.0	.278	.000	.368	2.1	.2	.2	.3	.6
2007–08	Milwaukee	46	2	13.7	**.532**	.000	.397	4.0	.5	**.7**	.4	2.0
2008–09	Portland	11	0	3.2	.286	.000	**1.000**	1.0	.0	.3	.1	.5
Career		414	58	14.4	.407	.000	.459	3.9	.6	.5	.4	1.7

=== Playoffs ===
Year	Team	GP	GS	MPG	FG%	3P%	FT%	RPG	APG	SPG	BPG	PPG
2005	Washington	**9**	0	**17.3**	**.700**	.000	**.563**	4.1	**1.0**	.3	**.3**	**2.6**
2006	Washington	6	0	11.7	.500	.000	.000	2.7	.7	.2	**.3**	.3
2007	Washington	4	0	7.0	.333	.000	.000	2.3	.0	**.8**	.0	.5
2009	Portland	1	0	5.0	.000	.000	.500	**5.0**	.0	.0	.0	1.0
Career		20	0	13.0	.563	.000	.500	3.4	.7	.4	.3	1.4
