= Summit Christian Academy =

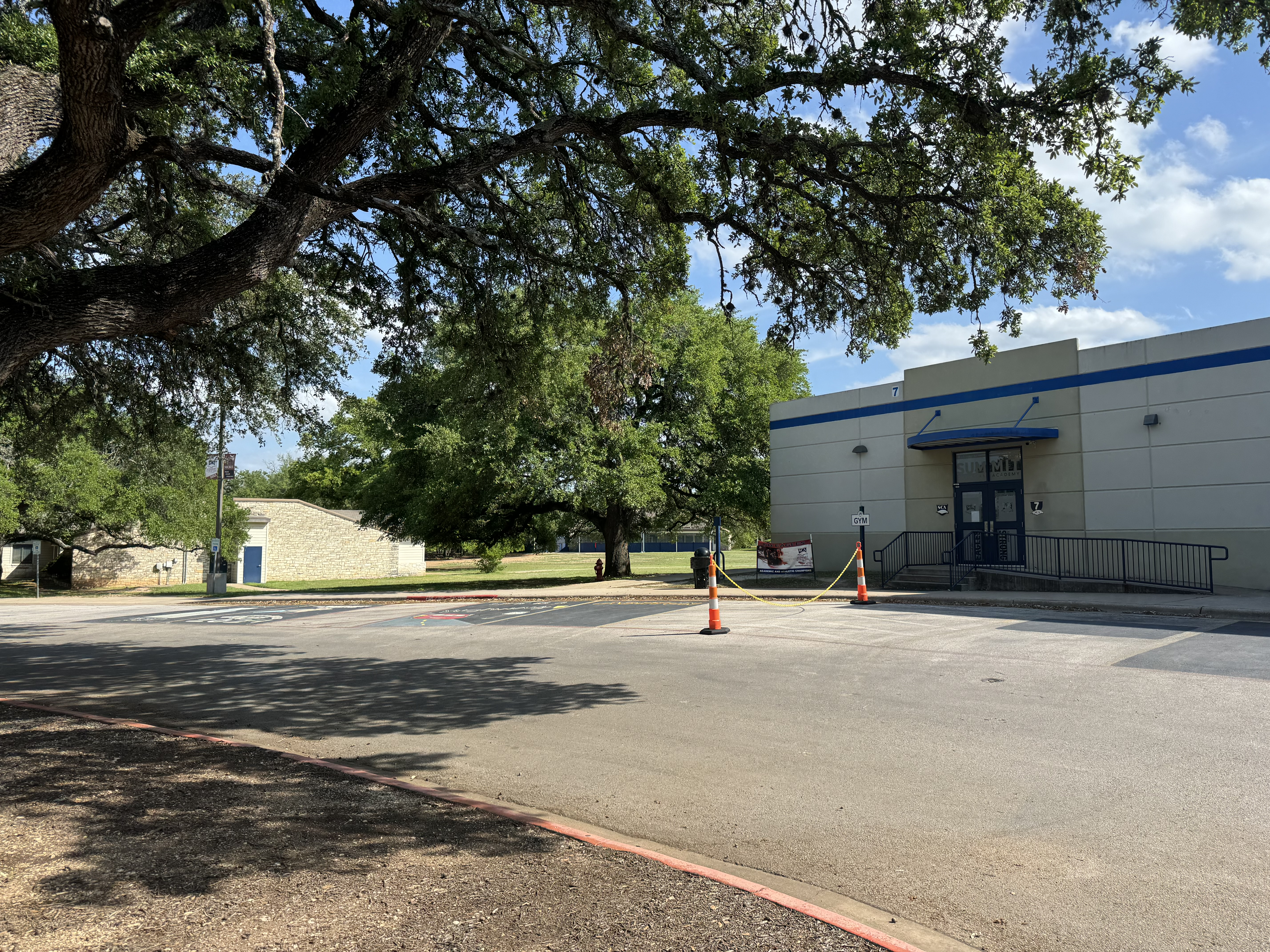
- Summit Christian Academy entrance in 2024

Location
- 2121 Cypress Creek Road; Cedar Park, Texas 78613; United States
- Coordinates: 30.475302°N 97.842297°W

Information
- Type: Private Christian
- Established: 1998
- Superintendent: Colonel Scott Mac Leod (Retired)
- Faculty: 37
- Grades: PreK-12
- Enrollment: 270 (2013-2014)
- Color
- Team name: Eagles
- Website: Official Website

Summit Christian Academy is a private, non-denominational Christian school for PreK-4 through 12th grade students. It is located in Cedar Park, TX and serves the Williamson County and Austin, Texas area.

Summit Christian Academy offers a core curriculum as well as Spanish for elementary students and Dual Credit and Advanced Placement courses, to include AP Art, for secondary students.

In an Innovation Center established in 2020 students are taught Technology Foundations and may take electives in Engineering and Computer Science. Paul Austin, Lego Mindstorm Developer and retired National Instruments Chief Architect is the Innovation Director.

Thirteen varsity athletic teams compete for Summit in the Texas Association of Private and Parochial Schools league. Varsity sports include 6-man football, girls volleyball, boys and girls cross country, boys and girls basketball, boys and girls track & field, boys and girls tennis, boys and girls golf and baseball. Intermediate and elementary sports beginning in 4th grade are also available. The school mascot is an eagle.
