= Bob Patterson (basketball) =

American basketball player (1932–2018)

Personal information
- Born: April 21, 1932 Kansas City, Missouri, U.S.
- Died: November 7, 2018 (aged 86) Tulsa, Oklahoma, U.S.
- Listed height: 6 ft 4 in (1.93 m)
- Listed weight: 205 lb (93 kg)

Career information
- High school: East (Kansas City, Missouri)
- College: Tulsa (1951–1955)
- NBA draft: 1955: 5th round
- Drafted by: Boston Celtics
- Position: Power forward / small forward

Career highlights
- First-team All-American – Look (1955); Third-team All-American – NEA (1955); First-team All-MVC (1955); No. 30 retired by Tulsa Golden Hurricane
- Stats at Basketball Reference

Robert Eugene Patterson (April 21, 1932 – November 7, 2018) was an American basketball player known for his All-American college career at the University of Tulsa.

Born and raised in Kansas City, Missouri, Patterson came to Tulsa from East High School, where he was named the city's top player as a senior. The 6'4" forward averaged 27.6 points and 13.1 rebounds per game in the 1954–55 season and was the focal point of the Golden Hurricane's first Missouri Valley Conference (MVC) championship team and NCAA Tournament participant that year. He was named All-MVC as a junior and senior. He was also the first Tulsa player to be selected as an All-American, earning first-team honors from Look Magazine and a third-team choice by the Newspaper Enterprise Association. After graduating from Tulsa, Patterson was drafted by the Boston Celtics in the fifth round of the 1955 NBA draft. He was the first Hurricane player to be drafted by the NBA.

Patterson left Tulsa as the school's all-time leading scorer and rebounder (both marks since eclipsed). He was the first basketball player selected to the school's athletic hall of fame as well as the first to have his jersey retired by the school.

Following his basketball career, Patterson moved to private business. He died on November 7, 2018, at age 86 in Tulsa, Oklahoma.
