= Tulsa Golden Hurricane men's basketball =

Men's college basketball team

Tulsa Golden Hurricane
2026–27 Tulsa Golden Hurricane men's basketball team
- University: University of Tulsa
- Head coach: Eric Konkol (5th season)
- Location: Tulsa, Oklahoma
- Arena: Reynolds Center (capacity: 8,355)
- Conference: The American
- Nickname: Golden Hurricane
- Colors: Crimson, royal blue, and old gold
- Student section: The Chaos

NCAA Division I tournament Elite Eight
- 2000
Other NCAA Division I tournament results
Sweet Sixteen	1955, 1994, 1995, 2000
Appearances	1955, 1982, 1984, 1985, 1986, 1987, 1994, 1995, 1996, 1997, 1999, 2000, 2002, 2003, 2014, 2016

NIT champions
- 1981, 2001

Conference tournament champions
- 1982, 1984, 1986, 1996, 2003, 2014

Conference regular-season champions
- 1955, 1984, 1985, 1987, 1994, 1995, 1999, 2000, 2002, 2014, 2020

Uniforms
Home	Away	Alternate

The Tulsa Golden Hurricane men's basketball team represents the University of Tulsa in Tulsa, in the U.S. state of Oklahoma. The team participates in the American Conference. The Golden Hurricane are led by head coach Eric Konkol, hired from Louisiana Tech on March 21, 2022, to replace Frank Haith who had resigned.

The team has long been successful, especially since the hiring of Nolan Richardson in 1980. Many big-name coaches previously worked at Tulsa, like University of Kansas coach Bill Self and University of Minnesota coach Tubby Smith. The Hurricane have been to the NCAA tournament 14 times in their history. In addition, they have won two National Invitation Tournaments, in 1981 and 2001, and one CBI tournament. In 2005, Street & Smith's named the University of Tulsa as the 59th best college basketball program of all time.

== History ==
Clarence Iba, brother of Henry Iba, helped to springboard Tulsa to success when named the school's first full-time head coach in 1949. He coached at the school for 11 years, the longest tenure of any Tulsa coach, and is the second all-time winningest coach at the school with 137 wins in his 11 seasons.

Nolan Richardson is credited with bringing the Tulsa program to national prominence when hired in 1980, and he led the school to the 1981 NIT Championship and had a .763 winning percentage at the school. He became the first coach in NCAA history to win 50 games in his first two seasons.

In the 1990s and 2000s, a succession of Tulsa coaches went on to big-name programs across the country, including Tubby Smith, Buzz Peterson, and Bill Self. The team remained successful throughout the string of coaches.

Doug Wojcik, coach from 2005 to 2012, is the all-time winningest coach at the school with 140 wins.

Notable assistants in the program's history have included Billy Gillispie, Flip Saunders, Kevin O’Neill, Mike Anderson, Ron Jirsa and Jerry Wainwright.

== Notable players ==
The Tulsa program has had players who later played in the NBA. Other players include Gary Collier, the 1994 MVC player of the year; Michael Scott, the 1989 and 1991 MVC defensive player of the year; and Willie Biles, who led the MVC in scoring in the 1972–73 and 1973–74 seasons.

Among those who did make it to the NBA, James King, who came back to coach the program after his NBA career, and Bingo Smith had the greatest success. King was selected to the 1968 NBA All-Star Game, and Smith scored more than 10,000 points in his career, having his number retired by the Cleveland Cavaliers. Steve Bracey (1970–72) was a member of the 1974–75 Golden State Warriors NBA Championship team.

=== Golden Hurricane players in the NBA ===
Name	Years Played	Teams
Steve Bracey	1973–1975	Atlanta Hawks and Golden State Warriors
Jordan Clarkson	2014–present	Los Angeles Lakers, Cleveland Cavaliers, Utah Jazz and New York Knicks
Joe Cooper	1982–1985	New Jersey Nets, Los Angeles Lakers, Washington Bullets, San Diego Clippers, and Seattle SuperSonics
Al Cueto	1970–1971	Miami Floridians and Memphis Pros
Julian Hammond	1968–1972	Denver Rockets
Steve Harris	1986–1990	Houston Rockets, Golden State Warriors, Detroit Pistons, and Los Angeles Clippers
Shaquille Harrison	2018–2022	Phoenix Suns, Chicago Bulls, Utah Jazz, Denver Nuggets, and Brooklyn Nets
DaQuan Jeffries	2020–2025	Sacramento Kings, Houston Rockets, Memphis Grizzlies, Charlotte Hornets
Neil Johnson	1967–1973	New York Knicks, Phoenix Suns, and Virginia Squires
Jerome Jordan	2012–2015	New York Knicks and Brooklyn Nets
Jim King	1964–1973	Los Angeles Lakers, San Francisco Warriors, Cincinnati Royals, and Chicago Bulls
Will Magnay	2021	New Orleans Pelicans
Carlton McKinney	1990–1992	Los Angeles Clippers and New York Knicks
Tracy Moore	1992–1997	Dallas Mavericks, Detroit Pistons, and Houston Rockets
Paul Pressey	1983–1993	Milwaukee Bucks, San Antonio Spurs, and Golden State Warriors
Michael Ruffin	2000–2009	Chicago Bulls, Philadelphia 76ers, Utah Jazz, Washington Wizards, Milwaukee Bucks, and Portland Trail Blazers
Shea Seals	1998	Los Angeles Lakers
Bingo Smith	1970–1980	San Diego Rockets, Cleveland Cavaliers, and San Diego Clippers
Ken Smith	1976	San Antonio Spurs
Ben Uzoh	2011–2012	New Jersey Nets, Cleveland Cavaliers, and Toronto Raptors

== History ==
Tulsa's basketball program was founded by W.R. Bergen in 1907, when the school still went by the name Kendall College. It went 1–1 in its first season. Following the 1908–09 season, the team went on hiatus for several years before restarting for the 1913–14 season under Harvey Allen. In 1917, the school played its first games outside the state of Oklahoma, but did not see great success until Francis Schmidt became head coach in 1918; Schmidt led the school to 16 consecutive victories in the 1919–20 season, the school record. The team hit hard times and achieved occasional modest success until the arrival of Clarence Iba in 1949. Of special note is the 1942–1943 winless squad under Mike Milligan, whose team went 0–10.

Under Iba, Tulsa reached the post-season for the first time in the 1953 NIT. (In March 1921, Tulsa had been invited to the National A.A.U. tournament after an 18–1 season which widely regarded them as Oklahoma champions). In 1955, Iba led the Golden Hurricane to their first Missouri Valley Conference title and NCAA tournament appearance. Joe Swank succeeded Iba in 1960. It was under Swank that the color barrier was broken in the Tulsa basketball program. Swank had some winning seasons, but the program would be without real success until the arrival of Nolan Richardson.

Nolan Richardson's hiring helped to usher in a new era of success at Tulsa that has remained fairly consistent since then. He led the team the NIT Championship in the 1980–1981 season, his first at the school. Richardson also won two MVC regular season and two MVC tournament championships in his five-season tenure. His flamboyant personality made him extremely popular; his teams adopted McFadden & Whitehead's "Ain't No Stoppin' Us Now" as their theme song during the Richardson years. Richardson was succeeded by J. D. Barnett, who continued the team's success, winning one tournament and one regular season championship and finishing lower than third in the conference only once. Barnett was fired, however, due to the significant increase in expectations at Tulsa following Richardson's success.

Barnett was succeeded by Tubby Smith, who went on to coach at Kentucky, Georgia and Minnesota. Smith spent four seasons at Tulsa, winning two MVC championships and leading them past the first round of the NCAA tournament for the first time, to the Sweet Sixteen in both the 1993–1994 and 1994–1995 seasons. A succession of high-profile coaches came through following Smith's departure for Georgia. Steve Robinson led the team to consecutive NCAA appearances before departing for Florida State. Bill Self succeeded Robinson for three seasons, winning two WAC titles in the 1998–99 and 1999–00 seasons and leading Tulsa to its best record ever, a 32–5 record in the 1999–00 season. Tulsa advanced to the Elite Eight in the 2000 NCAA tournament as a #7 seed. Self departed for Illinois and was succeeded by Buzz Peterson. Peterson led the team to the 2001 NIT Championship and promptly took the head coaching position at the University of Tennessee.

Following Peterson's departure, John Phillips led the team to NCAA tournaments in his first two seasons and won a WAC title. However, he passed on local high school star Caleb Green, a decision that came back to haunt him when Green signed with ORU. Phillips resigned on Christmas Day, 2004. The team finished that season 9th in the WAC, TU's worst ever conference finish. Doug Wojcik was hired before the 2005–06 season to revive the program. He led the team to 20 wins in both his second, third, and fourth seasons and the 2008 College Basketball Invitational championship, led by tournament MVP Jerome Jordan. Wojcik's hiring also coincided with Tulsa's decision to join Conference USA.

Much has been made of Tulsa's ability to hire good coaching candidates but their inability to retain them like Gonzaga has been able to. Since Barnett's firing after the 1990–91 season, only one coach has stayed at the program more than four seasons and all but one have departed for larger programs. Barnett has speculated that finances may be a reason when larger programs come calling, but he also "[does]n't know what the real philosophical reasons are."

=== Awards ===
Coach of the Year

- Clarence Iba – 1955 – MVC
- Joe Swank – 1967 – MVC
- Ken Hayes – 1969, 1973 – MVC
- Nolan Richardson – 1981, 1985 – MVC
- J. D. Barnett – 1987 – MVC
- Tubby Smith – 1994, 1995 – MVC
- Bill Self – 2000 – WAC
- Danny Manning – 2014 – C-USA
- Frank Haith – 2020 – AAC

Player of the Year

- Bingo Smith – 1969 – MVC
- Paul Pressey – 1982 – MVC
- Gary Collier – 1994 – MVC

Defensive Player of the Year

- Michael Scott – 1989, 1991 – MVC
- Lou Dawkins – 1994 – MVC

Freshman of the Year

- Shea Seals – 1994 – MVC
- Greg Harrington – 1999 – WAC

=== Retired numbers ===
Seven numbers have been retired by the University of Tulsa basketball program. The most recent was that of Bingo Smith on February 22, 2020.

Tulsa Golden Hurricane retired numbers
No.	Player	Tenure	No. ret.	Ref.
12	Willie Biles	1971–1974	2010	
20	Steve Harris	1981–1985		
21	Shea Seals	1993–1997	1997	
24	Jim King	1960–1963	2000	
25	Paul Pressey	1980–1982		
30	Bob Patterson	1951–1955		
32	Bingo Smith	1966–1969	2020	

== Post-season ==
The Golden Hurricane have made 16 NCAA tournament appearances (12–16 combined record), 10 NIT appearances (12–8 combined record), and two CBI appearances (5–2 combined record). They are twice NIT champions, in 1981 and 2001, and were champions of the CBI in 2008.

=== NCAA tournament results ===
Year	Seed	Round	Opponent	Result
1955		Sweet Sixteen; Regional third place game	Colorado; SMU	L 59–69; W 68–67
1982	3	Second round	(6) Houston	L 74–78
1984	4	Second round	(5) Louisville	L 67–69
1985	6	First round	(11) UTEP	L 75–79
1986	10	First round	(7) Navy	L 68–87
1987	11	First round	(6) Oklahoma	L 69–74
1994	12	First round Second Round; Sweet Sixteen	(5) UCLA (4) Oklahoma State (1) Arkansas	W 112–102; W 82–80; L 84–108
1995	6	First round Second Round; Sweet Sixteen	(11) Illinois (14) Old Dominion (2) Massachusetts	W 68–62; W 64–52; L 51–76
1996	11	First round	(6) Louisville	L 80–82^{OT}
1997	5	First round Second Round	(12) Boston University (4) Clemson	W 81–52; L 59–65
1999	9	First round Second Round	(8) College of Charleston (1) Duke	W 62–53; L 56–97
2000	7	First round Second Round; Sweet Sixteen; Elite Eight	(10) UNLV (2) Cincinnati (6) Miami (FL) (8) North Carolina	W 89–62; W 69–61; W 80–71; L 55–59
2002	12	First round Second Round	(5) Marquette (4) Kentucky	W 71–69; L 82–87
2003	13	First round Second Round	(4) Dayton (5) Wisconsin	W 84–71; L 60–61
2014	13	Second round	(4) UCLA	L 59–76
2016	11	First Four	(11) Michigan	L 62–67

=== NCAA tournament seeding history ===
The NCAA began seeding the NCAA Division I men's basketball tournament with the 1979 edition. The 64-team field started in 1985, which guaranteed that a championship team had to win six games.

Years →	'82	'84	'85	'86	'87	'94	'95	'96	'97	'99	'00	'02	'03	'14	'16
Seeds →	3	4	6	10	11	12	6	11	5	9	7	12	13	13	11

=== NIT results ===
The Golden Hurricane have two NIT championships, in 1981 and 2001.

Year	Round	Opponent	Result
1953	First round	Duquesne	L 69–88
1967	First round	Marquette	L 60–64
1969	First round	Saint Peter's	L 71–75
1981	First round Second round Quarterfinals; Semifinals; Championship	Pan American; UTEP; South Alabama; West Virginia; Syracuse	W 81–71; W 76–72; W 69–68; W 89–87; W 86–84
1990	First round	Oklahoma State	L 74–83
1991	First round	Oklahoma	L 86–111
2001	First round Second round Quarterfinals; Semifinals; Championship	UC Irvine; Minnesota; Ole Miss; Memphis; Alabama	W 75–71; W 73–70 ^{OT} W 77–75; W 72–64; W 79–66
2009	First round Second Round	Northwestern; Auburn	W 68–59; L 55–74
2010	First round	Kent State	L 74–75
2015	First round Second Round	William & Mary; Murray State	W 70–67; L 62–83
2026	First round Second round Quarterfinals; Semifinals; Championship	Stephen F. Austin; UNLV; Wichita State; New Mexico; Auburn	W 89–84 ^{OT} W 77–66; W 83–79; W 74–69; L 86–92 ^{OT}

=== CBI results ===
The Golden Hurricane were champions of the 2008 College Basketball Invitational, which was the inaugural tournament.

Year	Round	Opponent	Result
2008	First round Quarterfinals; Semifinals; Finals Game 1 Finals Game 2 Finals Game 3	Miami (OH); Utah; Houston; Bradley; Bradley; Bradley	W 61–45; W 69–60; W 73–69; W 73–68; L 74–83; W 70–64
2013	First round	Wright State	L 52–72

== Conferences ==
Tulsa has been a member of a variety of conferences over its history. With Oklahoma and Oklahoma State, the Oklahoma Collegiate Conference was formed for the 1914–1915 season. Tulsa would participate in this conference for fifteen years, with occasional breaks. In 1929, the program co-founded the Big Four Conference, which lasted five seasons.

The University of Tulsa joined the Missouri Valley Conference in 1934. Tulsa remained a member of the MVC until 1996, when it joined the Western Athletic Conference for the 1996–97 season. While a member of the WAC, it was at various times in both the Mountain and Pacific Division. Tulsa joined Conference USA with the 2005–2006 season. For the 2014–2015 season, the Golden Hurricane joined the American Athletic Conference.

== Arenas ==
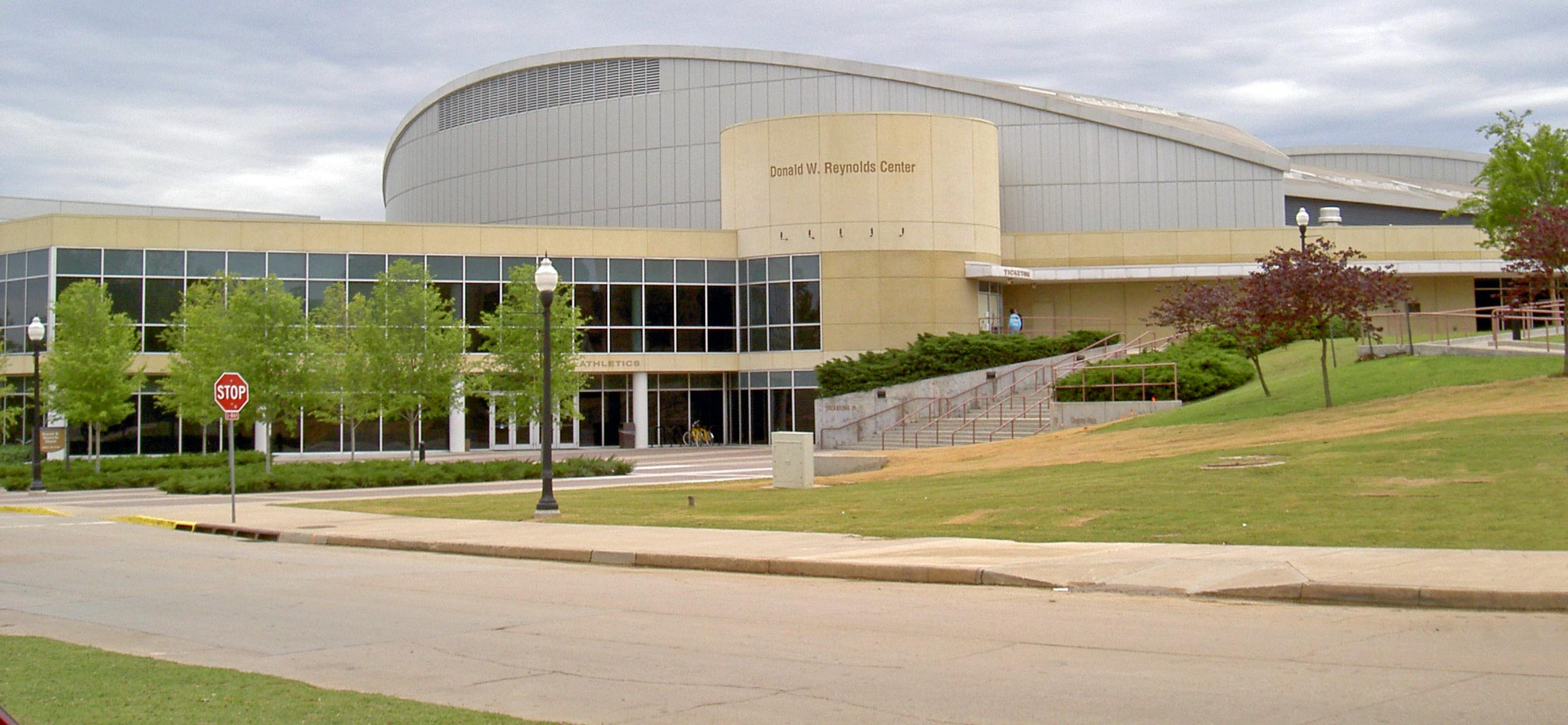
The Reynolds Center

Tulsa currently plays in the Reynolds Center, an 8,355-capacity on-campus arena adjacent to Skelly Field at H. A. Chapman Stadium. The Reynolds Center was completed in 1998. The student section is known as the Storm Front, and is known in the current year for members of the TU Chapter of Beta Upsilon Chi, who carry shields and wear various animal masks during opponent free throws. Efforts are made by the coaching staff through frequent e-mails to encourage attendance and creativity from the student body. Previously, the Golden Hurricane had played off-campus, using the Tulsa Convention Center from the mid 1976–77 season on. Before the Convention Center, the team played at the Expo Square Pavilion from the 1947–48 season. In the early years of the program, the team played at various area high schools and in smaller on-campus gymnasiums.

== Rivals ==
Tulsa's primary basketball rival is Wichita State, but that rivalry had faded somewhat between the time Tulsa left the Missouri Valley Conference after the 1995–96 season and both teams having joined the American Athletic Conference by 2017, when it was renewed indefinitely by both schools. Tulsa also has a mild rivalry with Oral Roberts, which is located in southern Tulsa. The teams began play in 1974 and has largely been one sided, however Oral Roberts has tightened the gap quite a bit in recent years, the two teams currently play annually. A traveling trophy, the Mayor's Cup, is exchanged between the winner of the game. Tulsa hired Bill Self away from Oral Roberts in 1997.

While in the Missouri Valley Conference, the Golden Hurricane had an extensive rivalry with Wichita State, Creighton, Southern Illinois and Bradley. The team has also had longstanding competitions against Oklahoma, Oklahoma State and Arkansas. The rivalry with Arkansas was enhanced with their hiring of Nolan Richardson away from Tulsa in 1985. Tulsa also had intense rivalries with Fresno State and Hawaii while a member of the Western Athletic Conference. Southern Methodist remains a fairly interesting rivalry, given that the two schools sometimes recruit similar players and that former SMU coach Matt Doherty was considered a front-runner for the Tulsa job prior to Doug Wojcik taking the helm; likewise, Doug Wojcik once interviewed for the SMU job. Former SMU head coach, Larry Brown, was the college coach of former Tulsa coach Danny Manning who left to become the head coach at Wake Forest in 2014.

Tulsa moved into the American Athletic Conference in July 2014, restoring natural rivalries with AAC members Memphis, Cincinnati, SMU and Houston.
