= 2011–12 America East Conference men's basketball season =

2011–12 American East Conference men's basketball season
- League: NCAA Division I
- Sport: Basketball
- Duration: November 2011 – March 2012
- Teams: 9

Regular Season
- Season champions: Stony Brook Seawolves
- Runners-up: Vermont Catamounts
- Season MVP: Darryl Partin
- Top scorer: Gerardo Suero (Albany) 19.2

Tournament
- Champions: Vermont Catamounts
- Runners-up: Stony Brook Seawolves
- Finals MVP: Brian Voelkel (Vermont)

America East Conference men's basketball seasons
- ← 2010–2011 2012–2013 →

2011–12 America East men's basketball standings
	Conf.				Overall
Team	W		L	PCT	W		L	PCT
Stony Brook	14	–	2	.875	22	–	10	.688
Vermont †	13	–	3	.813	24	–	12	.667
Boston University	12	–	4	.750	16	–	16	.500
Albany	9	–	7	.563	19	–	15	.559
Hartford	7	–	9	.438	9	–	22	.290
New Hampshire	7	–	9	.438	13	–	16	.448
Maine	6	–	10	.375	12	–	17	.414
UMBC	3	–	13	.188	4	–	26	.133
Binghamton	1	–	15	.063	2	–	29	.065
† 2012 America East tournament winner As of March 16, 2012; Rankings from AP Poll

== Preseason Poll ==
Rank	School(First Place Votes)	Votes
1	Boston University(6)	62
2	Stony Brook(3)	56
3	Vermont	46
4	Albany	42
5	New Hampshire	39
6	Maine	32
T-7	Hartford	18
T-7	UMBC	18
9	Binghamton	11

Preseason poll at AmericaEast.com

== Awards ==
=== Conference Preseason Team ===
First Team
Darryl Partin (Boston University)
Gerald McLemore (Maine)
Chris De La Rosa (UMBC)
Bryan Dougher (Stony Brook)
Brian Voelkel (Vermont)

Preseason All-Conference at AmericaEast.com

=== Weekly Awards ===
Week	Player of the Week	Freshmen of the Week
November 14, 2011	Brian Benson (New Hampshire)	Ben Dickinson (Binghamton)
November 21, 2011	Gerardo Suero (Albany)	Justin Edwards (Maine)
November 28, 2011	Darryl Partin (Boston University)	Justin Edwards (Maine)
December 5, 2011	D. J. Irving (Boston University)	Justin Edwards (Maine)
December 12, 2011	Gerardo Suero (Albany)	Wes Cole (Hartford)
December 19, 2011	Chase Plummer (UMBC)	Four McGlynn (Vermont)
December 26, 2011	Alasdair Fraser (Maine)	Justin Edwards (Maine)
January 2, 2012	Gerardo Suero (Albany)	Wes Cole (Hartford)
January 9, 2012	Gerardo Suero (Albany)	Four McGlynn (Vermont)
January 16, 2012	Mike Black (Albany); D. J. Irving (Boston University)	Justin Edwards (Maine)
January 23, 2012	Darryl Partin (Boston University); Tommy Brenton (Stony Brook)	Four McGlynn (Vermont)
January 30, 2012	Brian Dougher (Stony Brook)	Justin Edwards (Maine); Four McGlynn (Vermont)
February 6, 2012	Alasdair Fraser (Maine); Alvin Abreu (New Hampshire)	Justin Edwards (Maine)
February 13, 2012	Darryl Partin (Boston University)	Nake Sikma (Hartford); Four McGlynn (Vermont)
February 20, 2012	Ferg Myric (New Hampshire)	Mark Nwakamma (Hartford)
February 27, 2012	Jacob Iati (Albany)	Ben Dickinson (Binghamton)

=== All-Conference Teams ===
First Team
Gerardo Suero (Albany)
Darryl Partin (Boston University)
Tommy Brenton (Stony Brook)
Bryan Dougher (Stony Brook)
Matt Glass (Vermont)

Second Team
Mike Black (Albany)
D. J. Irving (Boston University)
Gerald McLemore (Maine)
Chase Plummer (UMBC)
Alvin Abreu (New Hampshire)

Third Team
Logan Aronhalt (Albany)
Andres Torres (Hartford)
Alasdair Fraser (Maine)
Dallis Joyner (Stony Brook)
Brian Voelkel (Vermont)

=== All-Defensive Team ===
First Team
Patrick Hazel (Boston University)
Mike Allison (Maine)
Chandler Rhoads (New Hampshire)
Tommy Brenton (Stony Brook)
Brian Voelkel (Vermont)

=== All-Freshmen Team ===
First Team
Ben Dickinson (Binghamton)
Mark Nwakamma (Hartford)
Nate Sikma (Hartford)
Justin Edwards (Maine)
Four McGlynn (Vermont)

=== All-Academic Team ===
First Team
Logan Aronhalt (Albany)
Andrew Rogers (Maine)
Brian Benson (New Hampshire)
Luke Apfeld (Vermont)
Sandro Carissimo (Vermont)

=== Player of the Year ===
Darryl Partin of Boston University was awarded Player of the Year honors in the 2011-2012 season.

=== Coach of the Year ===
Steve Pikiell of Stony Brook was awarded Coach of the Year honors in the 2011-2012 season.

=== Freshmen of the Year ===
Four McGlynn of Vermont was awarded Freshmen of the Year honors in the 2011-2012 season.

=== Defensive Player of the Year ===
Tommy Brenton of Stony Brook was awarded Defensive Player of the Year honors in the 2011-2012 season.

=== Scholar Athlete ===
Logan Aronhalt of Stony Brook was awarded Scholar Athlete honors in the 2011-2012 season.

== See also ==
- America East Conference
- 2013 America East men's basketball tournament
