= America East Conference men's basketball tournament =

Annual college basketball conference championship

America East men's basketball tournament
- Conference basketball championship
- Sport: College basketball
- Conference: America East Conference
- Number of teams: 8
- Format: Single-elimination
- Current location: Best seed arena
- Played: 1980–present
- Last contest: 2025
- Current champion: Bryant
- Most championships: Vermont (11)
- TV partner: ESPN+ ESPN2 (final)
- Official website: americaeast.com/mbball

Sponsors
- D-wave systems, PepsiCo and Adidas Originals

Host stadiums
- Varies year-to-year. Preliminary round awarded to conference school to host. Championship hosted by highest remaining seed.

The America East men's basketball tournament, popularly known as the America East Playoffs, is the annual concluding tournament for the NCAA college basketball in the America East Conference. The winner of the annual tournament gains an automatic bid to the NCAA Men's Division I Basketball Championship.

== Format and hosts ==
As of 2013, the first rounds take place at a single location, usually the home arena of one of the conference schools, but the championship game is hosted the next weekend by the higher remaining seed. The 2013 and 2014 Tournament preliminary rounds were hosted by the University at Albany. Beginning in 2015, the format was changed from a single location in the first rounds to multiple locations. For every round, including the finals the higher seeded team in each game hosts. After the first round, teams are reseeded to account for upsets that may have occurred.

Beginning with the 2018 edition, the last place team in the conference standings will not take part in the tournament. This change was made due to the impending eligibility of UMass Lowell for NCAA-sponsored postseason play, following the completion of the school's transition from NCAA Division II.

== History of the tournament finals ==
Year	Champion	Score	Runner-up	Reggie Lewis Most Outstanding Player	Tournament venue
1980	Holy Cross	81–75	Boston University	Ron Perry, Holy Cross	Preliminary rounds at campus sites Final at Hart Center (Worcester, MA)
1981	Northeastern	81–79 OT	Holy Cross	Perry Moss, Northeastern	Preliminary rounds at campus sites Final at Cabot Center (Boston, MA)
1982	Northeastern	82–59	Niagara	Perry Moss, Northeastern	Preliminary rounds at campus sites Final at Matthews Arena (Boston, MA)
1983	Boston University	63–62	Holy Cross	Mike Alexander, Boston University	Preliminary rounds at campus sites Final at Case Gym (Boston, MA)
1984	Northeastern	85–75	Canisius	Mark Halsel, Northeastern	Preliminary rounds at campus sites Final at Matthews Arena (Boston, MA)
1985	Northeastern	68–67	Boston University	Reggie Lewis, Northeastern	Preliminary rounds at campus sites Final at Matthews Arena (Boston, MA)
1986	Northeastern	63–54	Boston University	Wess Fuller, Northeastern	Preliminary rounds at campus sites Final at Matthews Arena (Boston, MA)
1987	Northeastern	71–68	Boston University	Reggie Lewis, Northeastern	Preliminary rounds at campus sites Final at Matthews Arena (Boston, MA)
1988	Boston University	79–68	Niagara	Jeff Timberlake, Boston University	Hartford Civic Center (Hartford, CT)
1989	Siena	68–67	Boston University	Marc Brown, Siena	Hartford Civic Center (Hartford, CT)
1990	Boston University	75–57	Vermont	Bill Brigham, Boston University	Hartford Civic Center (Hartford, CT)
1991	Northeastern	57–46	Maine	Ron Lacey, Northeastern	Preliminary rounds at campus sites Final at Matthews Arena (Boston, MA)
1992	Delaware	92–68	Drexel	Alex Coles, Delaware	Preliminary rounds at campus sites Final at Bob Carpenter Center (Newark, DE)
1993	Delaware	67–64	Drexel	Kevin Blackhurst, Delaware	Preliminary rounds at campus sites Final at Daskalakis Athletic Center (Philadelphia)
1994	Drexel	86–78	Maine	Malik Rose, Drexel	Preliminary rounds at campus sites Final at Daskalakis Athletic Center (Philadelphia)
1995	Drexel	72–52	Northeastern	Malik Rose, Drexel	Preliminary rounds at campus sites Final at Daskalakis Athletic Center (Philadelphia)
1996	Drexel	76–67	Boston University	Malik Rose, Drexel	Preliminary rounds at Bob Carpenter Center (Newark, DE); Final at Daskalakis Athletic Center (Philadelphia)
1997	Boston University	68–61	Drexel	Tunji Awojobi, Boston University	Preliminary rounds at Bob Carpenter Center (Newark, DE); Final at Case Gym (Boston, MA)
1998	Delaware	66–58	Boston University	Darryl Presley, Delaware	Bob Carpenter Center (Newark, DE)
1999	Delaware	86–67	Drexel	John Gordon, Delaware	Bob Carpenter Center (Newark, DE)
2000	Hofstra	76–69	Delaware	Speedy Claxton, Hofstra	Preliminary rounds at Bob Carpenter Center (Newark, DE); Final at Hofstra Arena (Hempstead, NY)
2001	Hofstra	68–54	Delaware	Roberto Gittens, Hofstra	Preliminary rounds at Bob Carpenter Center (Newark, DE); Final at Hofstra Arena (Hempstead, NY)
2002	Boston University	66–40	Maine	Billy Collins, Boston University	Preliminary rounds at Matthews Arena (Boston, MA); Final at Case Gym (Boston, MA)
2003	Vermont	56–55	Boston University	Matt Sheftic, Vermont	Preliminary rounds at Walter Brown Arena (Boston, MA); Final at Case Gym (Boston, MA)
2004	Vermont	72–53	Maine	Taylor Coppenrath, Vermont	Preliminary rounds at Walter Brown Arena (Boston, MA); Final at Patrick Gym (Burlington, VT)
2005	Vermont	80–57	Northeastern	Taylor Coppenrath, Vermont	Preliminary rounds at Events Center (Vestal, NY); Final at Patrick Gym (Burlington, VT)
2006	Albany	80–67	Vermont	Jamar Wilson, Albany	Preliminary rounds at Events Center (Vestal, NY); Final at Recreation and Convocation Center (Albany, NY)
2007	Albany	60–59	Vermont	Jamar Wilson, Albany	Preliminary rounds at Agganis Arena (Boston, MA); Final at Patrick Gym (Burlington, VT)
2008	UMBC	82–65	Hartford	Jay Greene, UMBC	Preliminary rounds at Events Center (Vestal, NY); Final at Retriever Activities Center (Catonsville, MD)
2009	Binghamton	61–51	UMBC	D.J. Rivera, Binghamton	Preliminary rounds at SEFCU Arena (Albany, NY); Final at Events Center (Vestal, NY)
2010	Vermont	83–70	Boston University	Marqus Blakely, Vermont	Preliminary rounds at Chase Arena (West Hartford, CT); Final at Patrick Gym (Burlington, VT)
2011	Boston University	56–54	Stony Brook	John Holland, Boston University	Preliminary rounds at Chase Arena (West Hartford, CT); Final at Agganis Arena (Boston, MA)
2012	Vermont	51–43	Stony Brook	Brian Voelkel, Vermont	Preliminary rounds at Chase Arena (West Hartford, CT); Final at Stony Brook Arena (Stony Brook, NY)
2013	Albany	53–49	Vermont	Mike Black, Albany	Preliminary rounds at SEFCU Arena (Albany, NY); Final at Patrick Gym (Burlington, VT)
2014	Albany	69–60	Stony Brook	Peter Hooley, Albany	Preliminary rounds at SEFCU Arena (Albany, NY); Final at Pritchard Gymnasium (Stony Brook, NY)
2015	Albany	51–50	Stony Brook	Peter Hooley, Albany	Preliminary rounds at campus sites Final at SEFCU Arena (Albany, NY)
2016	Stony Brook	80–74	Vermont	Jameel Warney, Stony Brook	Preliminary rounds at campus sites Final at Island Federal Credit Union Arena (Stony Brook, NY)
2017	Vermont	56–53	Albany	Anthony Lamb, Vermont	Preliminary rounds at campus sites Final at Patrick Gym (Burlington, VT)
2018	UMBC	65–62	Vermont	Jairus Lyles, UMBC	Preliminary rounds at campus sites Final at Patrick Gym (Burlington, VT)
2019	Vermont	66–49	UMBC	Anthony Lamb, Vermont	Preliminary rounds at campus sites Final at Patrick Gym (Burlington, VT)
2020	Cancelled due to the coronavirus pandemic, Vermont awarded tournament championship				
2021	Hartford	64–50	UMass Lowell	Austin Williams, Hartford	Preliminary rounds at campus sites Final at Chase Arena (West Hartford, CT)
2022	Vermont	82–43	UMBC	Ben Shungu, Vermont	Preliminary rounds at campus sites Final at Patrick Gym (Burlington, VT)
2023	Vermont	72–59	UMass Lowell	Dylan Penn, Vermont	Preliminary rounds at campus sites Final at Patrick Gym (Burlington, VT)
2024	Vermont	66–61	UMass Lowell	Shamir Bogues, Vermont	Preliminary rounds at campus sites Final at Patrick Gym (Burlington, VT)
2025	Bryant	77–59	Maine	Earl Timberlake, Bryant	Preliminary rounds at campus sites Final at Chace Athletic Center (Smithfield, RI)
2026	UMBC	74–59	Vermont	DJ Armstrong Jr., UMBC	Preliminary rounds at campus sites Final at Chesapeake Employers Insurance Arena (Baltimore, MD)

== Championships by School ==
School	Tournament Championships	Championships
Vermont	11	2003, 2004, 2005, 2010, 2012, 2017, 2019, 2020, 2022, 2023, 2024
Northeastern^{†}	7	1981, 1982, 1984, 1985, 1986, 1987, 1991
Boston^{†}	6	1983, 1988, 1990, 1997, 2002, 2011
Albany	5	2006, 2007, 2013, 2014, 2015
Delaware^{†}	4	1992, 1993, 1998, 1999
UMBC	3	2008, 2018, 2026
Drexel^{†}	3	1994, 1995, 1996
Hofstra^{†}	2	2000, 2001
Bryant	1	2025
Hartford^{†}	1	2021
Stony Brook^{†}	1	2016
Binghamton	1	2009
Siena^{†}	1	1989
Holy Cross^{†}	1	1980
Maine	0	
UMass Lowell	0	
New Hampshire	0	
NJIT	0	

- ^{†}Former member of the America East

Maine, New Hampshire, UMass Lowell, and NJIT are the only remaining teams in the conference to have never won a title.

== NCAA Tournament appearances ==
Year	AmEast Team	Opponent	Result
1980	(11) Holy Cross	(6) Iona	L 78–84
1981	(11) Northeastern	(6) Fresno State (3) Utah	W 55–53; L 69–94
1982	(11) Northeastern	(6) Saint Joseph's (3) Villanova	W 63–62; L 72–76^{3OT}
1983	(12) Boston	(12) La Salle	L 58–70
1984	(11) Northeastern	(11) Long Island (6) VCU	W 90–87; L 69–70
1985	(14) Northeastern	(3) Illinois	L 57–76
1986	(13) Northeastern	(4) Oklahoma	L 74–80
1987	(14) Northeastern	(3) Purdue	L 95–104
1988	(15) Boston	(2) Duke	L 69–85
1989	(14) Siena	(3) Stanford (11) Minnesota	W 80–78; L 67–80
1990	(16) Boston	(1) Connecticut	L 52–76
1991	(16) Northeastern	(1) North Carolina	L 66–101
1992	(13) Delaware	(4) Cincinnati	L 47–85
1993	(13) Delaware	(4) Louisville	L 70–76
1994	(13) Drexel	(4) Temple	L 39–61
1995	(13) Drexel	(4) Oklahoma State	L 49–73
1996	(12) Drexel	(5) Memphis (4) Syracuse	W 75–63; L 58–69
1997	(12) Boston	(5) Tulsa	L 52–81
1998	(15) Delaware	(2) Purdue	L 56–95
1999	(13) Delaware	(4) Tennessee	L 52–62
2000	(14) Hofstra	(3) Oklahoma State	L 66–86
2001	(13) Hofstra	(4) UCLA	L 48–61
2002	(16) Boston	(1) Cincinnati	L 52–90
2003	(16) Vermont	(1) Arizona	L 51–80
2004	(15) Vermont	(2) Connecticut	L 53–70
2005	(13) Vermont	(4) Syracuse (5) Michigan State	W 60–57^{OT} L 61–72
2006	(16) Albany	(1) Connecticut	L 59–72
2007	(13) Albany	(4) Virginia	L 57–84
2008	(15) UMBC	(2) Georgetown	L 47–66
2009	(15) Binghamton	(2) Duke	L 62–86
2010	(16) Vermont	(1) Syracuse	L 56–79
2011	(16) Boston	(1) Kansas	L 53–72
2012	(16) Vermont	(16) Lamar (1) North Carolina	W 71–59; L 58–77
2013	(15) Albany	(2) Duke	L 61–73
2014	(16) Albany	(16) Mount St. Mary's (1) Florida	W 71–64; L 55–67
2015	(14) Albany	(3) Oklahoma	L 60–69
2016	(13) Stony Brook	(4) Kentucky	L 57–85
2017	(13) Vermont	(4) Purdue	L 70–80
2018	(16) UMBC	(1) Virginia (9) Kansas State	W 74–54; L 43–50
2019	(13) Vermont	(4) Florida State	L 69–76
2021	(16) Hartford	(1) Baylor	L 55–79
2022	(13) Vermont	(4) Arkansas	L 71–75
2023	(15) Vermont	(2) Marquette	L 61–78
2024	(13) Vermont	(4) Duke	L 47–64
2025	(15) Bryant	(2) Michigan State	L 62–87
2026	(16) UMBC	(16) Howard	L 83–86

- 2020 NCAA tournament was canceled due to COVID-19.

== Broadcasters ==
=== Television ===
Year	Network	Play-by-play	Analyst	Sideline
2024	ESPN2	Robert Lee	Randolph Childress	
2023	ESPN2	Jay Alter	Terrence Oglesby	
2022	ESPN2	Doug Sherman	Paul Biancardi	
2021	ESPN2	Roy Philpott	Noah Savage	
2020	ESPN2	Dave O'Brien	Noah Savage	
2019	ESPN2	Doug Sherman	Paul Biancardi	Stormy Buonantony
2018	ESPN2	Doug Sherman	Mark Plansky	Olivia Harlan
2017	ESPN2	Mike Corey	Brooke Weisbrod	
2016	ESPN2	Mark Jones	Brooke Weisbrod	
2015	ESPN2	Bob Picozzi	Tim Welsh	
2014	ESPN2	Bob Picozzi	Tim Welsh	
2013	ESPN2	Bob Picozzi	LaPhonso Ellis	
2012	ESPN2	Bob Picozzi	LaPhonso Ellis	
2011	ESPN2	Beth Mowins	Mike Kelley	
2010	ESPN2	Bob Wischusen	Tim Welsh	
2009	ESPN2	Scott Graham	Tim Welsh	
2008	ESPN2	Bob Wischusen	Mike Kelley	
2007	ESPN2	Jon Sciambi	Bucky Waters	
2006	ESPN2	Bob Wischusen	Donny Marshall	
2005	ESPN	Dave Revsine	Jay Williams	
2004	ESPN	Dave Revsine	Doug Gottlieb	
2003	ESPN	Dave Revsine	Bob Wenzel	
2002	ESPN	Dave Revsine	Jay Bilas	
2001	ESPN	Michele Tafoya	Bob Wenzel	
2000	ESPN	Dave Strader	Jon Albright	
1999	ESPN	Dave Strader	Jay Bilas	

=== Radio ===
Year	Network	Play-by-play	Analyst
2024	Westwood One	Cooper Boardman	Nick Bahe
2023	Westwood One	Bill Rosinski	Nick Bahe
2022	Westwood One	Chris Lewis	Mo Cassara
2021	Westwood One	Brandon Gaudin	Kyle Macy
2019	Westwood One	Justin Kutcher	Tom Brennan
2018	Westwood One	Kevin Lee	Jon Crispin
2017	Westwood One	Patrick Kinas	Tom Brennan
2016	Westwood One	Scott Graham	Mo Cassara
2015	Westwood One	Brandon Gaudin	Mo Cassara

== See also ==
- America East Conference women's basketball tournament
