= Stony Brook Seawolves men's basketball =

Men's college basketball team

2025–26 Stony Brook Seawolves men's basketball team
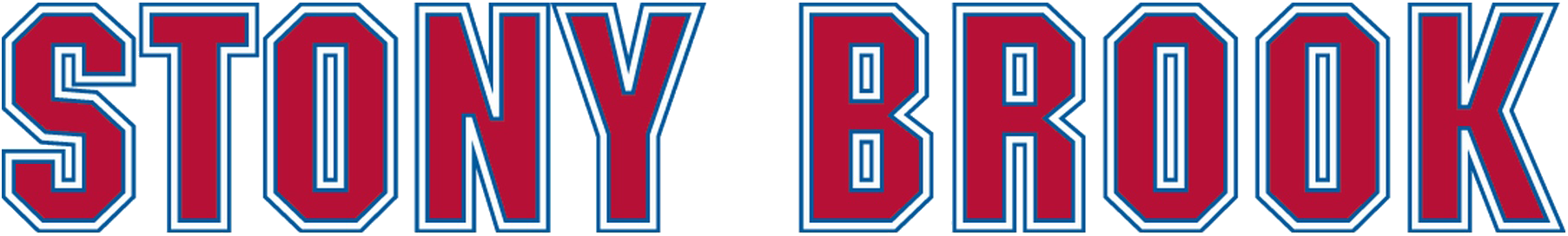
- University: Stony Brook University
- Head coach: Geno Ford (7th season)
- Location: Stony Brook, New York
- Arena: Island Federal Credit Union Arena (capacity: 4,160)
- Conference: Coastal Athletic Association
- Nickname: Seawolves
- Colors: Red, blue, and gray
- Student section: The Red Zone

NCAA Division I tournament appearances
- 2016

Conference tournament champions
- 2016

Conference regular-season champions
- 2010, 2012, 2013, 2016

Uniforms
Home	Away

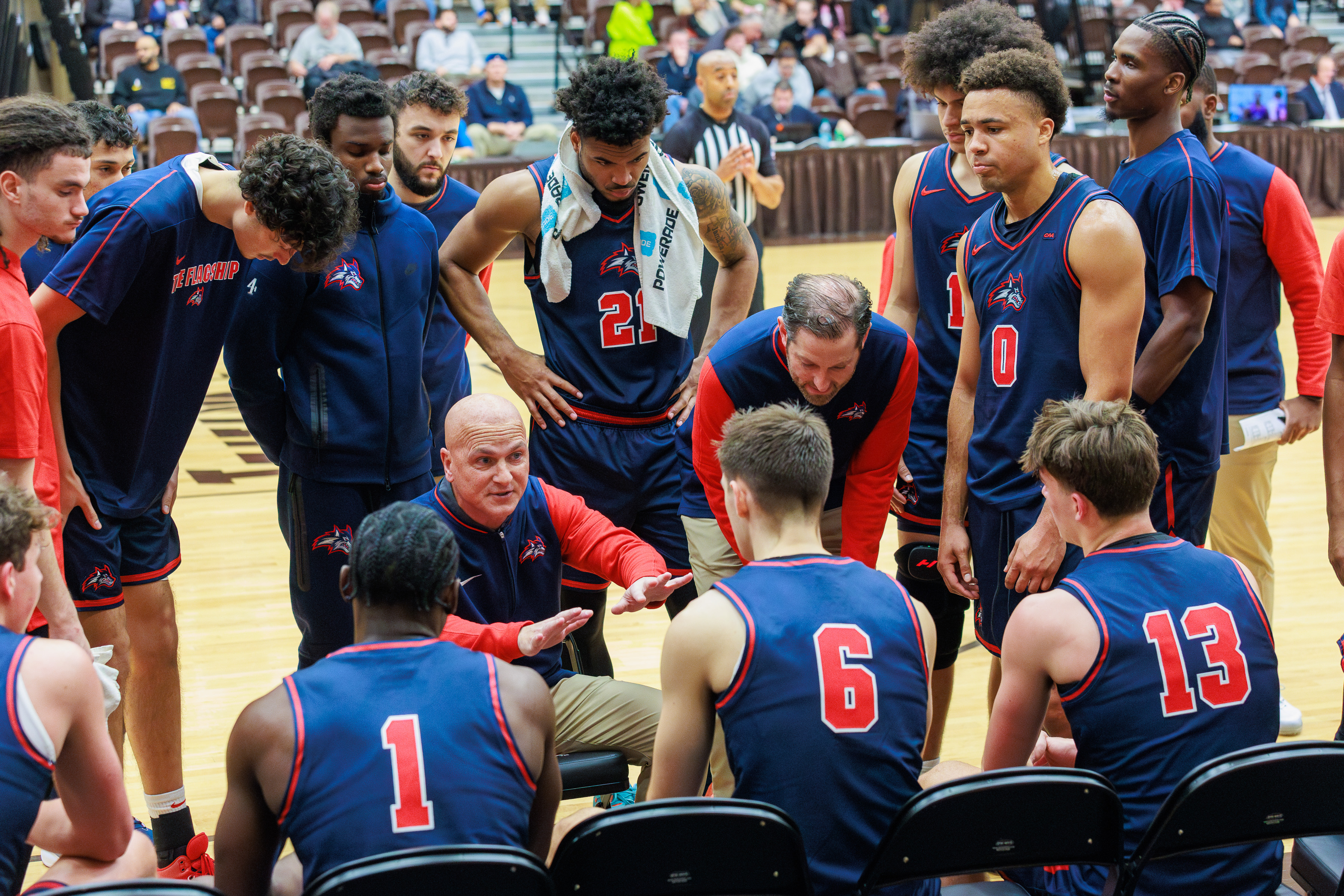
Coach Geno Ford huddles with players in 2024

The Stony Brook Seawolves men's basketball team is the intercollegiate men's basketball program representing Stony Brook University. The school competes in the Coastal Athletic Association in NCAA Division I of the National Collegiate Athletic Association (NCAA). The team plays its home games at Island Federal Credit Union Arena, located on the university's campus in Stony Brook, New York.

Stony Brook entered the Division I level in 1999, making the NCAA tournament for the first time in 2016. The team was a member of the America East Conference before moving to the CAA in 2022. Geno Ford has been the team's head coach since 2019.

The Seawolves have won four regular season conference championships and have reached the 20-win mark nine times as a Division I program. Stony Brook's official student section is known as "The Red Zone" and was voted as the top student section in the America East conference in the 2014 Naismith Student Section of the Year competition. In 2018, Jameel Warney became the first Stony Brook alumnus to play in the National Basketball Association (NBA).

== Team history ==
=== Pre-Division I era (1960–1999) ===
Stony Brook University, then the State University College on Long Island, first fielded a basketball program in the 1960–61 basketball season. While first struggling in its initial years with Dan Farrell (1960–64), Stony Brook later enjoyed some success in the Knickerbocker Conference with future NBA coach Herbie Brown (Larry Brown's brother). Brown was Stony Brook's head coach from 1964–69, earning conference Coach of the Year honors following the 1969 season. Hall of Fame coach Rollie Massimino, who later led Villanova to a national championship in 1985, coached Stony Brook from 1969 to 1971. During the 1977–78 season, Stony Brook reached the Final Four of the NCAA Division III men's basketball tournament. Coaches Ron Bash, Dick Kendall, and Joe Castiglie helped develop the program in the late 1970s and 1980s, and by the early 1990s, Stony Brook participated in the New York metropolitan-based Skyline Conference.

Under President Shirley Strum Kenny, Stony Brook transitioned to the Division I level in the 1990s. The Stony Brook Patriots were renamed to the Seawolves in 1995 and offered scholarships for the first time. The transition period occurred from 1995 to 1999, when head coach Bernard Tomlin led Stony Brook at the Division II level.

=== Early years in Division I, Steve Pikiell takes the helm (1999–2008) ===
On June 10, 1999, Tomlin was reassigned and Stony Brook hired Fordham head coach Nick Macarchuk to begin its tenure in Division I. In 2001, after two years as a Division I independent, the Seawolves joined the America East Conference. Macarchuk retired following the 2004–05 season, going 64–108 in six years, with just one winning season and three 20-loss seasons. Steve Pikiell, a former UConn point guard and recently the associate head coach at George Washington, was hired on April 13, 2005.

In May 2005, the NCAA placed Stony Brook on three years' probation, stripping 12.5 scholarships due to eligibility violations. The NCAA Committee of Infractions discovered that 53 athletes in 14 sports from 1999 to 2001 were ineligible to compete due to improper paperwork and lack of academic credit hours. "There was no evidence that the violations were intentional. Rather, they were the result of a compliance coordinator being overwhelmed with Division I requirements with which he was unfamiliar," read the report.

Stony Brook finished in last place during Pikiell's first season with a 4–24 (2–14 AE) record, but his first recruiting class was named 32nd-best in the nation and he was extended through 2010–11 on March 23, 2006. Stony Brook finished last again in 2006–07 and tied for last in 2007–08. In the Seawolves' first seven America East years, they were 55–140 (32–84 AE).

=== Pikiell brings success (2008–2016) ===
In every season from 2009–10 to 2015–16, Stony Brook either won the America East regular season title or appeared in the America East Finals, but the immense regular season success came with only one America East tournament victory as the Seawolves lost four America East title games in five years.

==== 2008–09 season ====
In the 2008–09 season, Pikiell led Stony Brook to their first winning season since joining the America East. The Seawolves finished 16–14 (8–8) and earned a No. 4 seed in the America East championship tournament. However, they suffered an opening-round loss to New Hampshire.

==== 2009–10 season ====
Stony Brook's run of success in the America East began in the 2009–10 season. The Seawolves ended with a 22–10 (13–3) record and won their first America East regular season title in program history. With the No. 1 seed in the America East tournament, the Seawolves beat eighth-seeded Albany 68–59 in the quarterfinals but lost to Boston University 70–63 in the semifinals. Their regular season title earned them an automatic bid to the 2010 NIT, where they hosted and lost to Illinois in the first round. The successful season led to the school's largest broadcasting package, with three games scheduled on the main ESPN channel, two on ESPNU, one on SNY and five on MSG+.

Senior guard Muhammad El-Amin won America East Player of the Year, the first Stony Brook player to capture the award. El-Amin was the leading scorer on the Seawolves. Steve Pikiell won Coach of the Year, the first Stony Brook coach to earn the honor.

==== 2010–11 season ====
Before the season, Tommy Brenton suffered a knee injury that would cost him the entire year. Stony Brook opened at UConn, losing 79–52 loss to Pikiell's former team and the eventual national champions. Stony Brook won their ESPN debut against Monmouth, 51–49. The team earned a No. 5 seed in the America East tournament, defeating fourth-seeded Albany in the quarterfinals 67–61. The Seawolves upset No. 1 seed Vermont in the semifinals, winning 69–47 to advance to the America East Finals for the first time in the program's history.

Hosted at Agganis Arena in Boston, Massachusetts, the Seawolves travelled to face a Boston Terriers team that had defeated them in the playoffs last year. Despite leading by as much as 15 in the second half, the team allowed 14 straight points to John Holland that cut their 41–26 lead to 41–40. With the score tied at 54 with 2.4 seconds left, Holland was fouled and made both free throws as Stony Brook lost 56–54 and their first NCAA tournament bid came up short.

==== 2011–12 season ====
Prior to the season, the Seawolves played an exhibition tour in Europe against five teams. Stony Brook earned its second America East regular season championship and won 14 games in conference for the first time, one of 13 Division I teams to go undefeated at home. The No. 1 seed in the America East, Stony Brook defeated Binghamton 78–69 and Albany 57–55 on a buzzer-beater tip-in to advance to its second straight conference finals, hosted at Stony Brook for the first time.

In front of a sold-out crowd at the Stony Brook Arena, Stony Brook lost 51–43 to Vermont, falling one game short of the NCAA Tournament for a second straight year. Stony Brook earned an automatic bid to the 2012 NIT, losing to top-seeded Seton Hall 63–61. Tommy Brenton won America East Defensive Player of the Year, the first-ever Stony Brook player to do so, while Steve Pikiell won Coach of the Year for the second time.

==== 2012–13 season ====
Stony Brook went 9–4 in non-conference play, losing only to Sacred Heart, UConn, Maryland and Seton Hall. Stony Brook won a second straight regular season title, winning 14 of its last 16 games to enter the postseason. As the No. 1 seed, Stony Brook beat Binghamton 72–49 in the America East quarterfinals but was upset by fourth-seed Albany in the semifinals. Trailing by 10 points with 3:47 left, Stony Brook came back to tie it before Albany hit a layup with 2.4 seconds left for the 61–59 loss. Stony Brook earned an automatic bid to the 2013 NIT, beating UMass 71–58 in the first round for their first-ever NIT victory. In the second round, they lost to Iowa 75–63 to end the season 25–8 (14–2 AE).

Senior forward Tommy Brenton won America East Player of the Year and Defensive Player of the Year, freshman forward Jameel Warney won Rookie of the Year, and Pikiell won his third Coach of the Year award.

==== 2013–14 season ====
Stony Brook started 8–4 before losing two straight to VCU and Columbia. The Seawolves started 7–0 in conference and ended 13–3, not winning the regular season for the first time since 2010–11. As the No. 2 seed in the America East tournament, they beat Maine 80–54 in the quarterfinals and Hartford 69–64 in the semifinals to reach the America East Finals for the third time in four years. However, for the fifth straight year, Stony Brook's NCAA tournament ambitions were thwarted. Playing against Albany in front of a sold-out crowd at Pritchard Gymnasium, the Seawolves led 52–46 with 7:02 remaining, but the Great Danes roared back and defeated Stony Brook 69–60. Stony Brook received an invite to the 2014 College Basketball Invitational, where they lost to Siena 66–55 in the first round. Stony Brook finished the season with a 23–9 (13–3) record. As a sophomore, Warney won his first America East Player of the Year after ranking top five nationally in field goal percentage and leading Stony Brook in scoring, rebounding, and blocking.

==== 2014–15 season ====
Stony Brook moved back to the newly-renovated Island Federal Credit Union Arena. In the arena's first game, Rayshaun McGrew hit a game-winning layup to beat Columbia 57–56. On December 28, the Seawolves upset No. 13 Washington on the road by a score of 62–57, their second win against a Power 5 conference in program history after beating Penn State in 2006. It was the program's first-ever win against a ranked opponent. The team was second in the America East at 12–4 behind Albany, who was 15–1, the only loss to Stony Brook. Stony Brook beat Binghamton and Vermont to reach its fourth America East finals in five years, still searching for their first NCAA tournament berth.

For the second straight year, Stony Brook faced Albany. On the road, Stony Brook led for almost the entire game but collapsed in the waning moments. Albany's Peter Hooley hit a three-pointer with 1.6 seconds to give the Great Danes a 51–50 victory after trailing for the rest of the contest as Albany benefited off of several Stony Brook turnovers and missed free throws. In the 2015 College Basketball Invitational, Stony Brook lost to Mercer 72–70 in the first round. Warney won his second straight America East Player of the Year award, as well as Defensive Player of the Year, after leading the nation with 20 double-doubles and ranking fifth with 11.4 rebounds per game.

==== 2015–16 season: First NCAA tournament berth ====
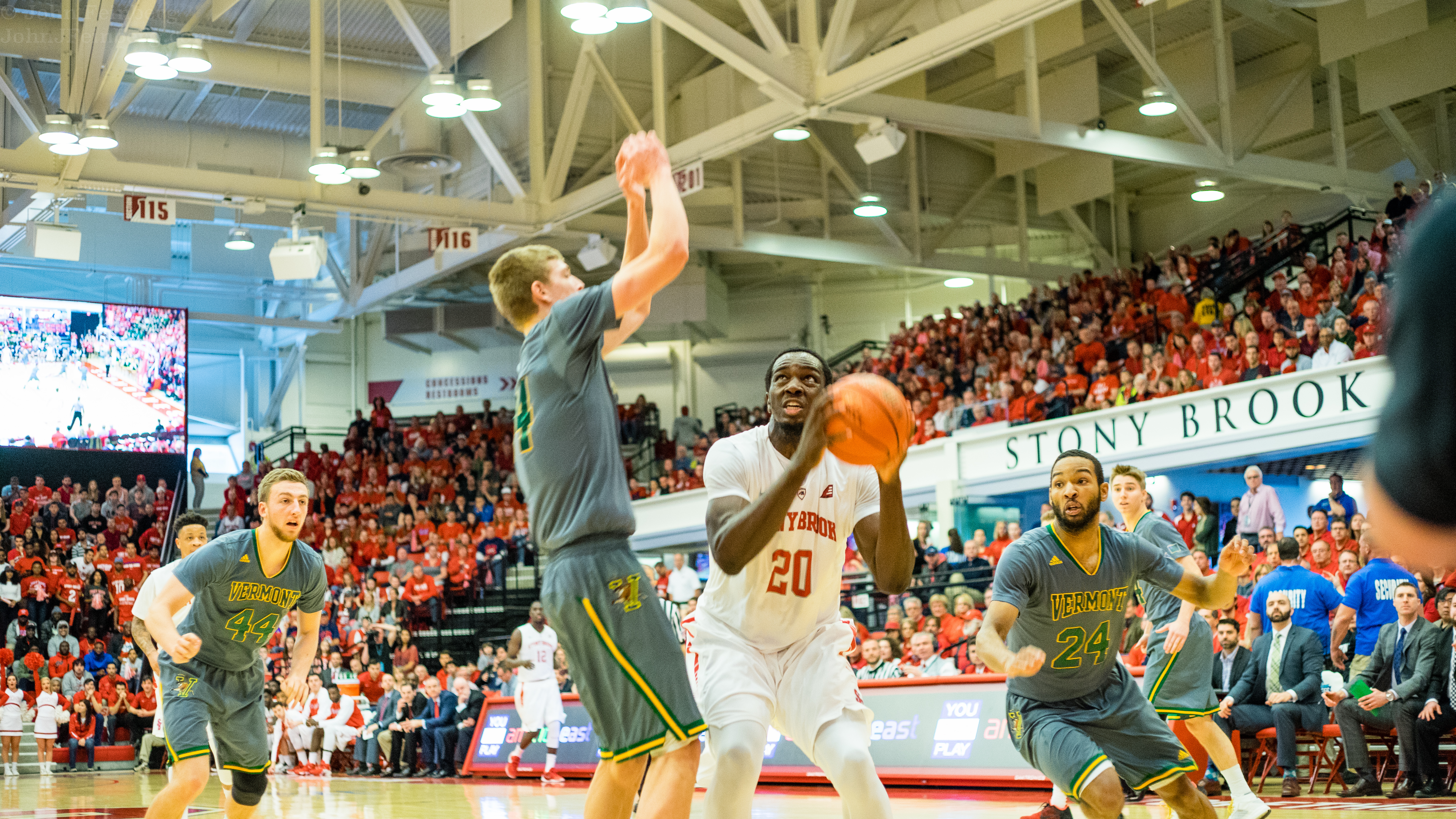
Jameel Warney scored 43 points against Vermont in the 2016 America East finals.

Stony Brook finished non-conference play with a 9–4 record, winning their final five games. The Seawolves began to garner national attention as they won the first thirteen games of conference play and their winning streak grew to 18 games, at the time the longest active streak in Division I. The streak was snapped on February 17 in an 82–70 loss to Albany that knocked Stony Brook to 22–5. The Seawolves lost the final game of the regular season, their first home loss of the year, to Vermont by a score of 76–62. However, Stony Brook still earned their fourth America East regular season championship in program history.

Championship banner

Stony Brook beat UMBC 86–76 in the quarterfinals and Hartford 80–64 in the semifinals, making their third straight America East Finals and their fifth in six years. Taking on Vermont, it looked as if the Seawolves would miss out yet again as they trailed by 14 points in the second half, but a furious comeback led by Finals MVP Jameel Warney, who scored 43 points, allowed Stony Brook to pull off the 80–74 comeback victory as they earned their first-ever berth to the NCAA tournament.

As the No. 13 seed, Stony Brook faced No. 4–seeded Kentucky in the first round and lost 85–57.

Warney won his third consecutive America East Player of the Year award, averaging a double-double for the second straight season. Warney joined Vermont's Taylor Coppenrath and Northeastern's Reggie Lewis as the only players to win three America East Player of the Year awards. Warney also won Defensive Player of the Year for the second straight year. Pikiell was named Coach of the Year for the fourth time.

On March 20, 2016, three days after Stony Brook's NCAA tournament appearance, Pikiell accepted the head coaching job at Rutgers, ending his Seawolves tenure with a 192–157 record in 11 seasons.

=== Jeff Boals takes over (2016–2019) ===
On April 8, 2016, Stony Brook hired Ohio State assistant Jeff Boals to succeed Pikiell. Picked to finish seventh in the conference preseason poll, Stony Brook finished in second place despite losing its top four scorers from the prior year. Stony Brook beat Binghamton 70–60 in the America East quarterfinals but was upset at home by three-seed Albany in the semifinals, 63–56.

In the 2017–18 season, Stony Brook had a losing record in conference play for the first time since 2007–08. On December 22, 2017, Stony Brook upset Pikiell and Rutgers 75–73 in overtime on the road. Stony Brook beat Albany 69–60 in the America East quarterfinals before losing to top-seeded Vermont 70–51 in the semifinals. Freshman forward Elijah Olaniyi was named America East Rookie of the Year.

Stony Brook began the 2018–19 season by beating George Washington 77–74 in overtime after trailing 22–0, the largest scoreless comeback in college since 1977. Three days later, Stony Brook beat South Carolina 83–81 for the program's first victory against an SEC team. Stony Brook ended the regular season with a 24–7 record, leading the nation with 13 road wins and earning the No. 2 seed in the America East Playoffs. The Seawolves were upset by Binghamton 78–72 in the quarterfinals, Stony Brook's first quarterfinal loss in a decade. Sophomore center Jeff Otchere was named America East Defensive Player of the Year, and sophomore guard/forward Andrew Garcia won America East Sixth Man of the Year.

On March 17, 2019, Boals resigned to accept the head coaching job for the Ohio Bobcats, his alma mater, going 55–41 overall and 33–17 in the America East in three seasons. Geno Ford was promoted from assistant to interim head coach for the 2019 College Basketball Invitational, where the Seawolves blew a 25-point first-half lead against South Florida, ultimately losing 82–79 in overtime.

=== The Geno Ford era (2019–present) ===
On March 26, 2019, Ford's interim tag was removed and he was officially named the fourth head coach in the program's Division I era. In Ford's first season, Stony Brook won 20 games for the eighth time in the last 11 seasons and finished in second place in the America East, their ninth top-2 finish over that time period. After defeating Albany in the America East quarterfinals, Stony Brook was upset 64–58 at home by Hartford in the semifinals to end their season at 20–13. In the offseason, the program lost three stars to Power 5 schools, with Elijah Olaniyi transferring to Miami (FL), Makale Foreman transferring to California and Andrew Garcia transferring to Georgia.

In Ford's second season, Stony Brook finished 9–14, their worst record in 13 years. The Seawolves were eliminated in the first round of the America East playoffs after blowing a 16-point second half lead against UMass Lowell. Mouhamadou Gueye was named the America East Defensive Player of the Year. Stony Brook was named preseason favorites ahead of the 2021–22 season, but in February, the America East banned then-second place Stony Brook from participating for the conference championship as a result of the school's impending move to the Colonial Athletic Association (CAA). Stony Brook's final America East game after 21 years was a 87–68 win over NJIT on March 1, 2022.

The 2022–23 season, Stony Brook's first in the CAA, was marred by several season-ending injuries as the Seawolves finished 11–22. Stony Brook earned a CAA tournament win over North Carolina A&T, 76–61 in the first round, losing to champions Charleston in the quarterfinals. In 2023–24, Stony Brook finished tied for sixth place in its second CAA season. Seeded seventh in the CAA tournament, Stony Brook earned upsets over two-seed Drexel, 91–88 (2OT) in the quarterfinals, and three-seed Hofstra, 63–58 in the semifinals to face top-seed Charleston in the championship game. Up by five at halftime, Stony Brook scored the final nine points in regulation to force overtime but lost 82–79, one win shy of an NCAA tournament bid. Stony Brook was the first seven seed to advance to the CAA Finals since East Carolina in 1993.

== Facilities ==
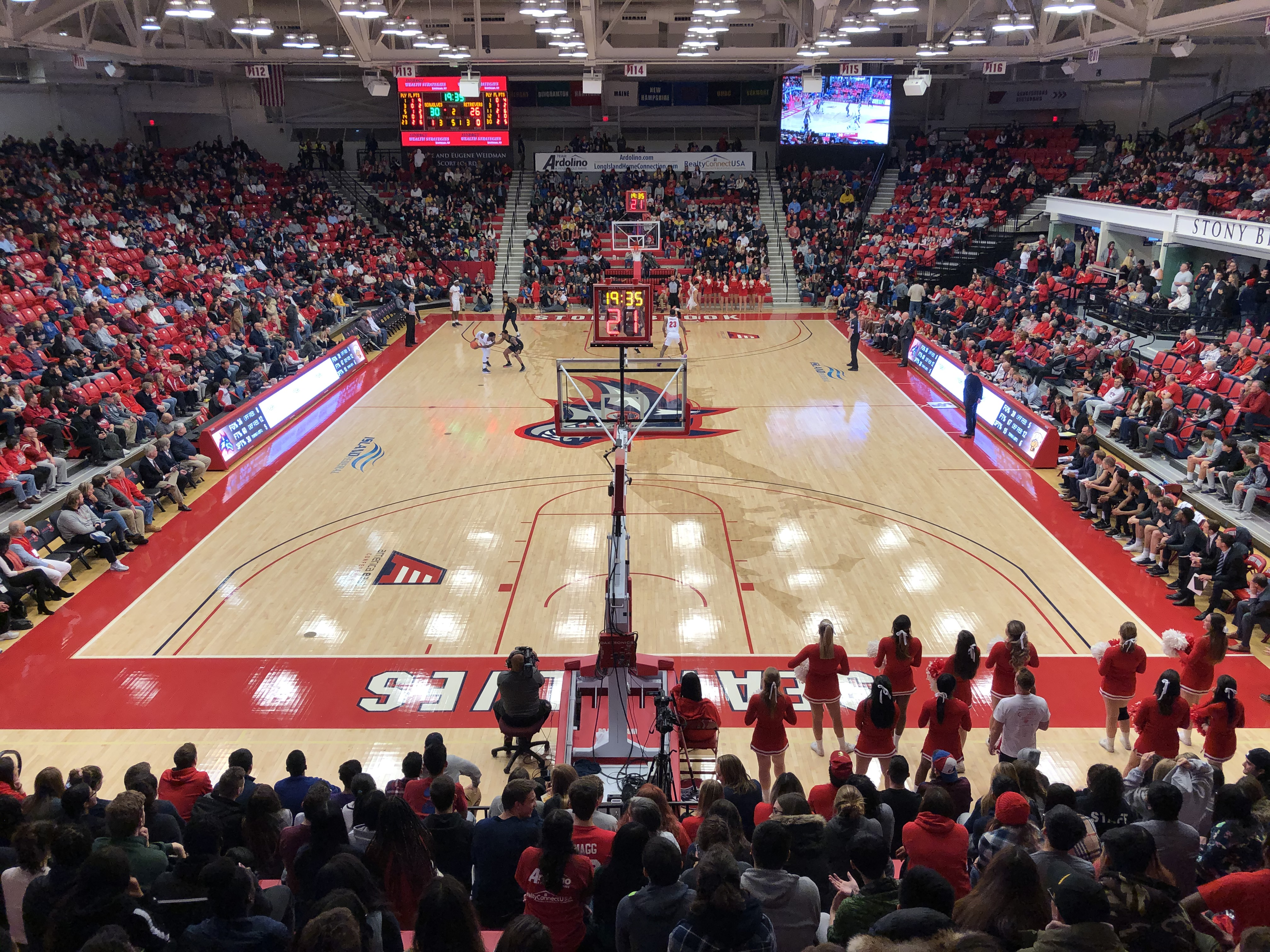
Island Federal Arena

During the earliest years of the program, Stony Brook played at nearby Walt Whitman High School (1960–1962) and Port Jefferson High School (1962–1964). The campus was originally located in Oyster Bay, New York when the school was known as the State University College on Long Island, moving to Stony Brook in 1962.

Pritchard Gymnasium opened in 1964. Stony Brook played there until the opening of the Stony Brook Arena in 1990. In 2008, plans were made to renovate Stony Brook Arena and the Seawolves moved back to Pritchard Gymnasium until 2014. However, Stony Brook's first round NIT game against Illinois in 2010 and America East championship game against Vermont in 2012 were still played in the arena in order to meet minimum seating requirements. During Stony Brook's final three seasons at Pritchard Gymnasium, the Seawolves had a 37–3 record at home.

The Stony Brook Arena underwent a $21.1 million renovation from 2012 to 2014, and was renamed the Island Federal Credit Union Arena (now commonly referred to as simply Island Federal Arena) after a $7 million partnership with Island Federal Credit Union. Stony Brook played its first game at the newly-named arena on November 14, 2014, beating Columbia on a last-second layup. The arena seats 4,160.

== Team ==
2024–25 Stony Brook Seawolves men's basketball team
Players
Coaches

Pos.	#	Name	Height	Weight	Year	Previous school	Hometown
G	0	Joe Octave	6 ft 4 in (1.93 m)	200 lb (91 kg)	GS	Holy Cross	Gardena, California
G	1	Sabry Philip	6 ft 4 in (1.93 m)	205 lb (93 kg)	GS	Navarro College	Edmonton, Alberta
G	3	CJ Luster II	6 ft 3 in (1.91 m)	165 lb (75 kg)	Jr	Salt Lake Community College	Denton, Texas
G	4	Toby Onyekonwu	6 ft 2 in (1.88 m)	170 lb (77 kg)	Jr	Joliet West High School	Joliet, Illinois
F	5	Ben Wight	6 ft 9 in (2.06 m)	220 lb (100 kg)	GS	Toledo	Columbus, Ohio
G	6	Jared Frey	6 ft 6 in (1.98 m)	196 lb (89 kg)	So	Andrews Osborne Academy	Columbus, Ohio
G/F	11	Nick Woodard	6 ft 6 in (1.98 m)	215 lb (98 kg)	Jr	Southwest Tennessee Community College	Oglethorpe, Georgia
G	12	Bryan Mitchell	6 ft 1 in (1.85 m)	160 lb (73 kg)	Fr	IMG Academy	Englewood Cliffs, New Jersey
G	13	Collin O'Connor	6 ft 3 in (1.91 m)	195 lb (88 kg)	Fr	Western Reserve Academy	Dayton, Ohio
F	15	Quin Gorman	6 ft 8 in (2.03 m)	210 lb (95 kg)	Fr	Flint Hill School	Falls Church, Virginia
G/F	21	Andre Snoddy	6 ft 6 in (1.98 m)	223 lb (101 kg)	Sr	Central Connecticut	Melville, New York
G/F	24	Peyton Frey	6 ft 6 in (1.98 m)	210 lb (95 kg)	So	Hilliard Davidson High School	Columbus, Ohio
F	33	Leon Nahar	6 ft 10 in (2.08 m)	218 lb (99 kg)	So	Asheville School	Alkmaar, Netherlands
F	34	Jeremiah Nyarko	6 ft 9 in (2.06 m)	200 lb (91 kg)	Jr	Western Texas College	Accra, Ghana

Head coach

- Geno Ford (Ohio)

Assistant coach(es)

- Dan Rickard (Stony Brook)
- Jaden Uken (Nebraska)
- Mark Dixon (FIU)

Legend

- (C) Team captain
- (S) Suspended
- (I) Ineligible
- (W) Walk-on
- Injured
- Current redshirt

Roster
Last update: November 5, 2024

=== Retired numbers ===
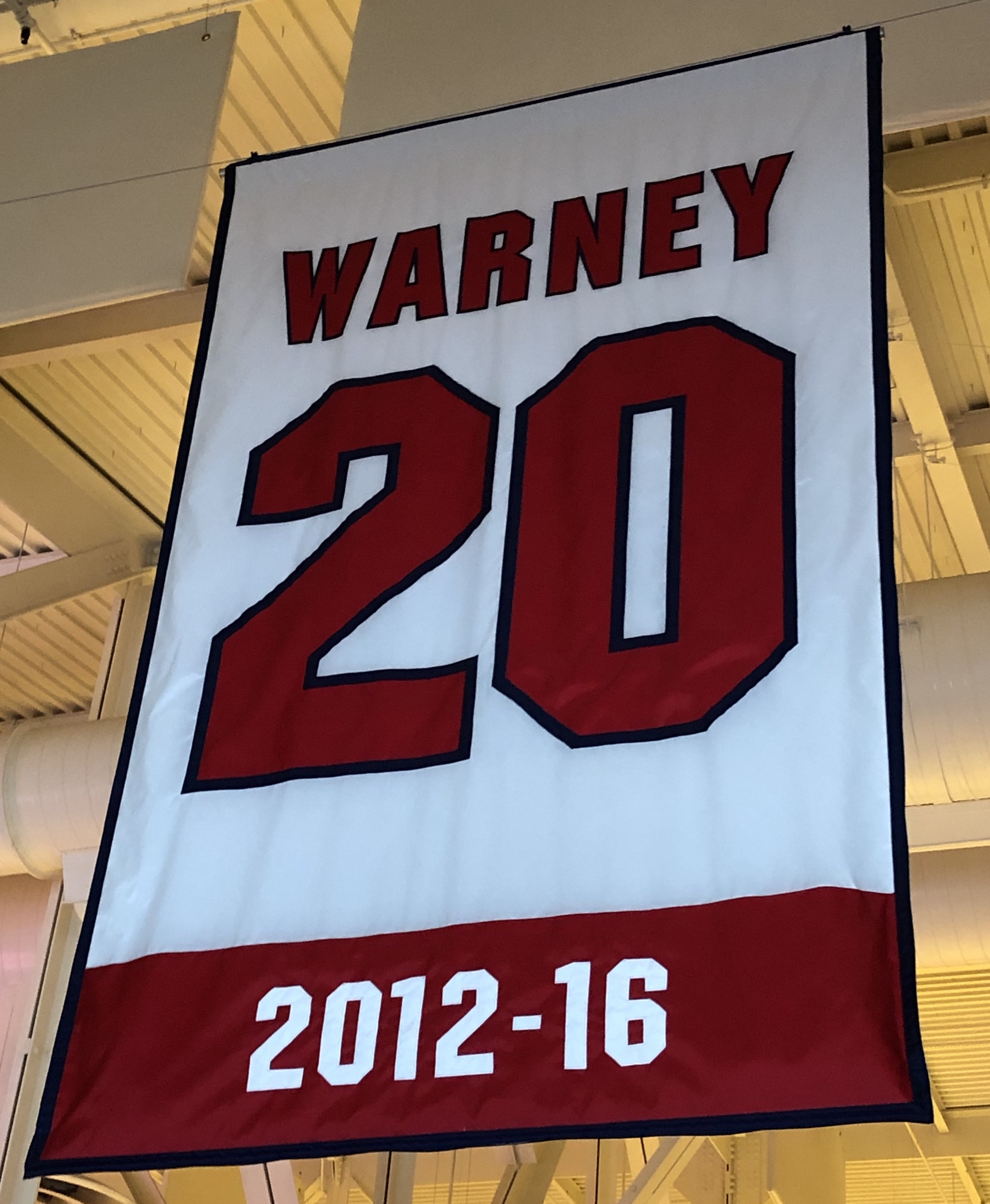
Jameel Warney's retired number

On February 18, 2017, less than a year after his graduation, power forward Jameel Warney's No. 20 was retired in a ceremony. It was the first number to be retired for a Stony Brook basketball player. Warney, a three-time America East Player of the Year, is Stony Brook's all-time leader in career points, rebounds, blocks, and games played. When Warney signed a 10-day contract with the Dallas Mavericks on March 11, 2018, he became the first Stony Brook alum to play in the NBA.

== Coaches ==
=== Head coaches ===
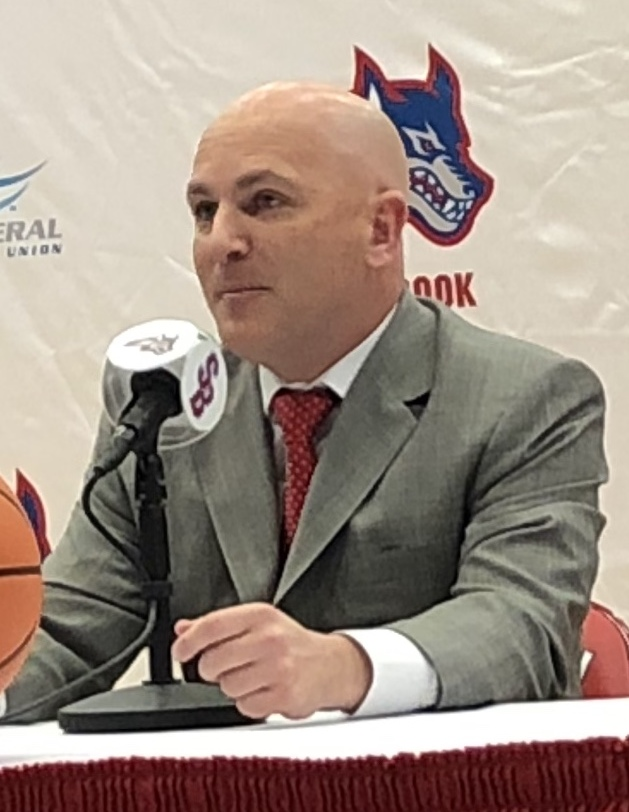
Geno Ford, current Stony Brook head coach

The following have been the head coaches of Stony Brook men's basketball since 1960.

No.	Tenure	Coach	Years	Record	Pct.
1	1960–1964	Dan Farrel	4	–	–
2	1964–1969	Herb Brown	5	–	–
3	1969–1971	Rollie Massimino	2	–	–
4	1971–1974	Don Covaleski	3	–	–
5	1974–1978	Ron Bash	4	–	–
6	1978–1984	Dick Kendall	6	–	–
7	1984–1991	Joe Castigle	7	–	–
8	1991–1999	Bernard Tomlin	8	–	–
9	1999–2005	Nick Macarchuk	6	64–108	.372
10	2005–2016	Steve Pikiell	11	192–156	.552
11	2016–2019	Jeff Boals	3	55–42	.567
12	2019–present	Geno Ford^	7	103–116	.470
Totals		12 coaches	27 seasons	414–422	.495
Records updated through end of 2025–26 season Source; *Alum^Promoted from assistant to head coach

=== Current coaching staff ===
Name	Type	College	Graduating Year
Geno Ford	Head coach	Ohio	1997
Dan Rickard	Associate Head Coach	Stony Brook	2010
Jaden Uken	Assistant Coach	Nebraska	2003
Mark Dixon	Assistant Coach	FIU	2020
Casey Crawford	Director of Basketball Operations	Ohio	2022

== Postseason ==
=== NCAA tournament results ===
The Seawolves made their first trip ever to the NCAA tournament in 2016 after winning the conference regular season and tournament championships. They lost in the first round as a #13 seed.

Year	Seed	Round	Opponent	Result
2016	#13	First Round	#4 Kentucky	L 57–85

=== NIT results ===
The Seawolves achieved their first National Invitation Tournament (NIT) appearance in 2010. They achieved their first-ever postseason tournament victory by defeating Massachusetts in the first round of the 2013 NIT before losing to Iowa in the second round. Their overall combined NIT record is 1–3.

Year	Round	Opponent	Result
2010	First Round	Illinois	L 66–76
2012	First Round	Seton Hall	L 61–63
2013	First Round; Second Round	Massachusetts; Iowa	W 71–58; L 63–75

=== CBI results ===
The Seawolves have appeared in the College Basketball Invitational (CBI) four times. Their combined record is 0–4.

Year	Round	Opponent	Result
2014	First Round	Siena	L 55–66
2015	First Round	Mercer	L 70–72
2017	First Round	UIC	L 69–71
2019	First Round	South Florida	L 79–82^{OT}

== Season-by-season results ==
Record table
Season	Coach	Overall	Conference	Standing	Postseason
Nick Macarchuk (Independent/America East) (1999–2005)
1999–2000	Nick Macarchuk	6–23			
2000–01	Nick Macarchuk	17–11			
2001–02	Nick Macarchuk	6–22	5–11	9th	
2002–03	Nick Macarchuk	13–15	7–9	7th	
2003–04	Nick Macarchuk	10–20	5–13	7th	
2004–05	Nick Macarchuk	12–17	6–12	7th	
Steve Pikiell (America East) (2005–2016)
2005–06	Steve Pikiell	4–24	2–14	9th	
2006–07	Steve Pikiell	9–20	4–12	9th	
2007–08	Steve Pikiell	7–23	3–13	9th	
2008–09	Steve Pikiell	16–14	8–8	4th	
2009–10	Steve Pikiell	22–10	13–3	1st	NIT first round
2010–11	Steve Pikiell	15–17	8–8	5th	
2011–12	Steve Pikiell	22–10	14–2	1st	NIT first round
2012–13	Steve Pikiell	25–8	14–2	1st	NIT second round
2013–14	Steve Pikiell	23–9	13–3	2nd	CBI first round
2014–15	Steve Pikiell	23–12	12–4	2nd	CBI first round
2015–16	Steve Pikiell	26–7	14–2	1st	NCAA Tournament first round
Jeff Boals (America East) (2016–2019)
2016–17	Jeff Boals	18–14	12–4	2nd	CBI first round
2017–18	Jeff Boals	13–19	7–9	5th	
2018–19	Jeff Boals; Geno Ford	24–9	12–4	2nd	CBI first round
Geno Ford (America East) (2019–2022)
2019–20	Geno Ford	20–13	10–6	2nd	
2020–21	Geno Ford	9–14	7–9	7th	
2021–22	Geno Ford	18–13	10–8	3rd	
Geno Ford (CAA) (2022–present)
2022–23	Geno Ford	11–22	6–12	10th	
2023–24	Geno Ford	20–15	10–8	T–6th	
2024-25	Geno Ford	4-16	0-7		
Total:		752–720 (.515)			
National champion Postseason invitational champion Conference regular season champion Conference regular season and conference tournament champion Division regular season champion Division regular season and conference tournament champion Conference tournament champion

== NBA players ==
Player	Debut	Team	Round	Pick
Jameel Warney	March 11, 2018	Dallas Mavericks	Undrafted / N/A	
Mouhamadou Gueye	February 12, 2024	Toronto Raptors	Undrafted / N/A	

== Players in international leagues ==
- Kent Washington

== Awards ==
America East Coach of the Year

- Steve Pikiell – 2010, 2012, 2013, 2016

America East Player of the Year

- Muhammed El-Amin – 2010
- Tommy Brenton – 2013
- Jameel Warney – 2014, 2015, 2016

America East Defensive Player of the Year

- Tommy Brenton – 2012, 2013
- Jameel Warney – 2015, 2016
- Jeff Otchere – 2019
- Mouhamadou Gueye – 2021

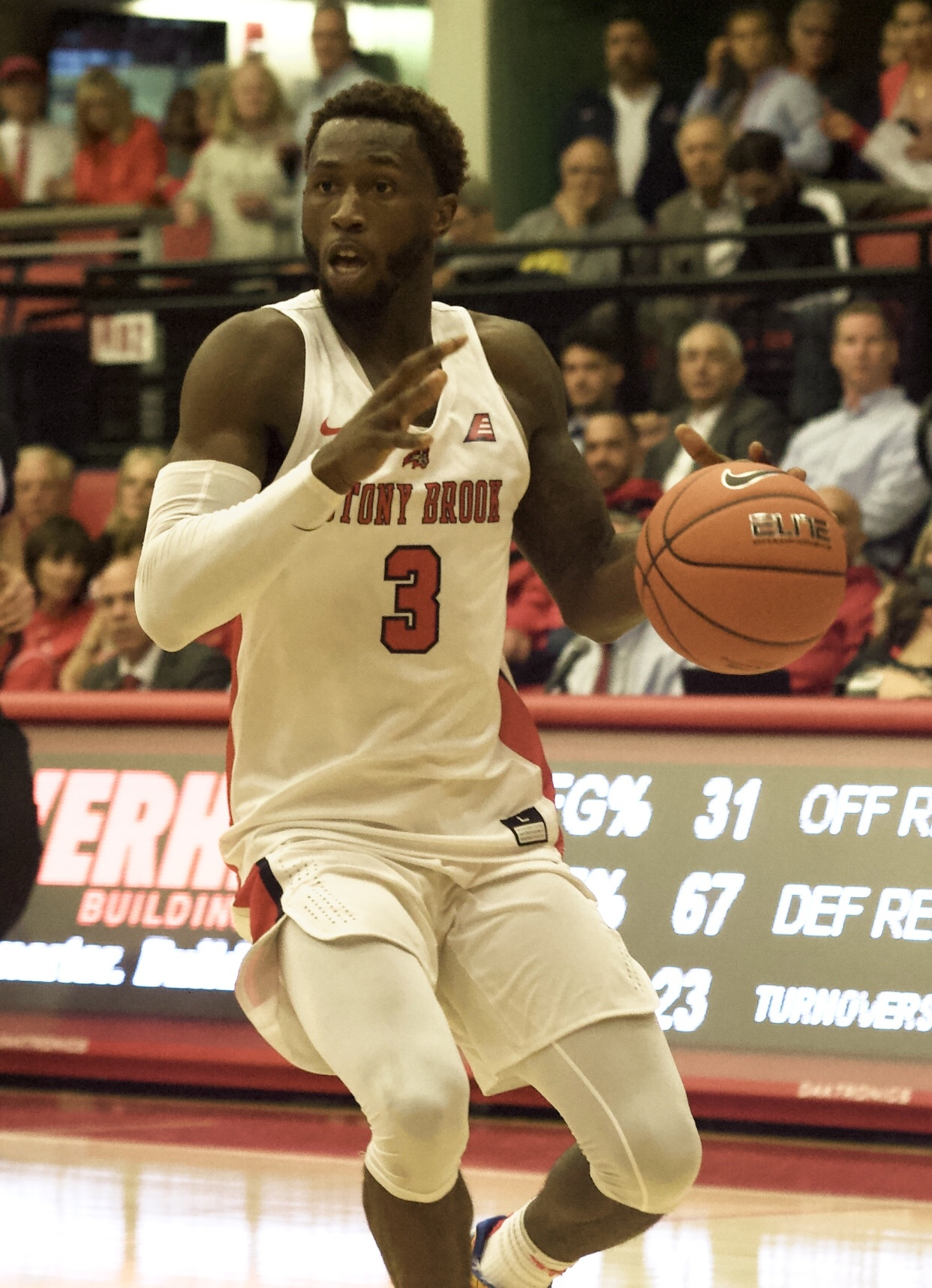
Elijah Olaniyi, 2018 Rookie of the Year and 2020 First Team All-Conference

America East Rookie of the Year

- Jameel Warney – 2013
- Elijah Olaniyi – 2018

America East Sixth Man of the Year

- Andrew Garcia – 2019
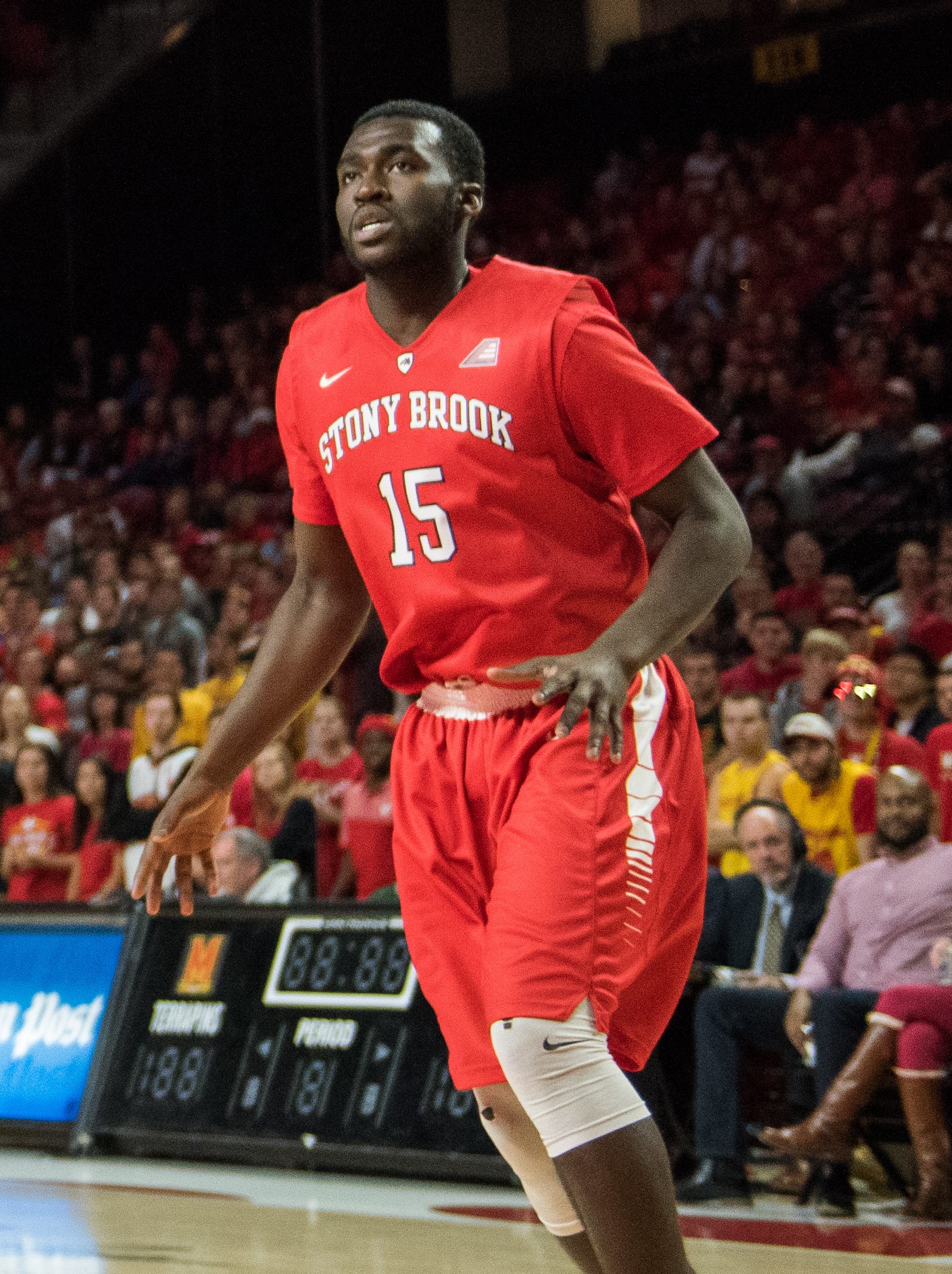
  Akwasi Yeboah, 2019 First Team All-Conference

America East All-Conference First Team

- Muhammed El-Amin – 2010
- Bryan Dougher – 2011
- Tommy Brenton – 2011, 2012
- Jameel Warney – 2014, 2015, 2016
- Carson Puriefoy – 2015, 2016
- Lucas Woodhouse – 2017
- Akwasi Yeboah – 2019
- Elijah Olaniyi – 2020

America East All-Conference Defensive Team

- Marques Cox – 2009
- Tommy Brenton – 2010, 2012, 2013
- Jameel Warney – 2013, 2015, 2016
- Dave Coley – 2013, 2014
- Rayshaun McGrew – 2016
- Ahmad Walker – 2016
- Roland Nyama – 2017
- Jeff Otchere – 2019, 2020
- Mouhamadou Gueye – 2021

== See also ==
- Stony Brook Seawolves women's basketball
- Battle of Long Island (college rivalry)
