= Dallis Joyner =

American basketball player (born 1990)

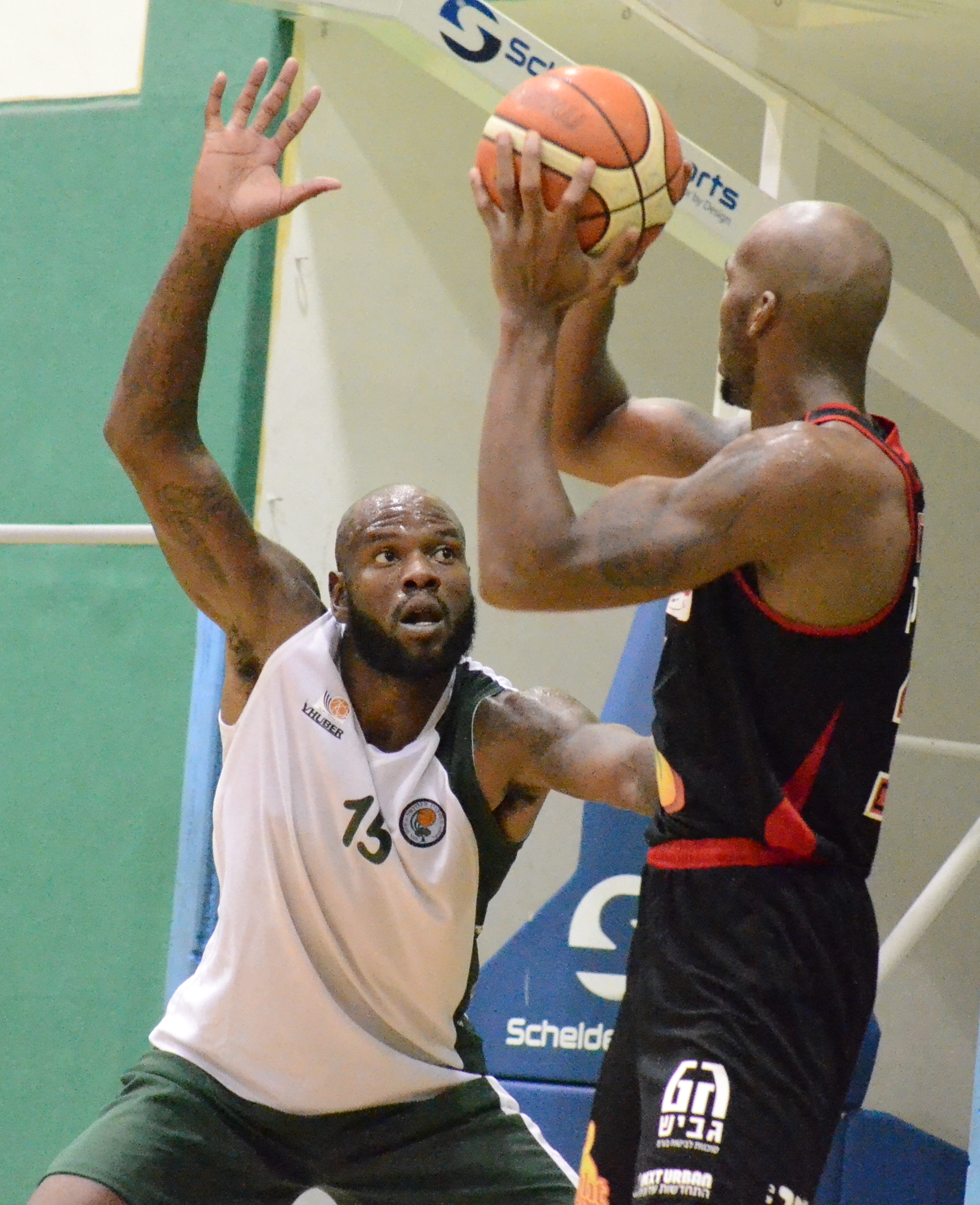
- Joyner (left) with Hapoel Kfar Saba in October 2017

No. 22 – Hebraica Macabi
- Position: Power forward / center
- League: Uruguayan Basketball League

Personal information
- Born: February 24, 1990 (age 36)
- Listed height: 6 ft 8 in (2.03 m)
- Listed weight: 249 lb (113 kg)

Career information
- High school: Granby (Norfolk, Virginia)
- College: Stony Brook (2008–2012)
- NBA draft: 2012: undrafted
- Playing career: 2012–present

Career history
- 2012–2013: Maccabi Kiryat Bialik
- 2013–2014: MBK Komárno
- 2014–2017: Ironi Kiryat Ata
- 2017: Águilas de Tunja
- 2017–2018: Hapoel Kfar Saba
- 2018: Hapoel Tel Aviv
- 2018–2019: Elitzur Yavne
- 2019: Hapoel Kfar Saba
- 2019–present: Hebraica Macabi

Career highlights
- Third-team All-America East (2012)

Dallis Terrell Joyner (born February 24, 1990) is an American professional basketball player for Hebraica Macabi of the Uruguayan Basketball League. He played college basketball for Stony Brook University before playing professionally in Israel, Slovakia, Colombia and Uruguay.

== Early life and college career ==
Joyner attended Granby High School in Norfolk, Virginia, where averaged 15 points and 14 rebounds per game as senior. Joyner was named first team All-District selection and third-team All-Region honoree.

Joyner played college basketball for Stony Brook University's Seawolves, where he averaged 9 points and 6.6 rebounds as a senior. Joyner led America East in field goal percentage in overall games (.611) and conference games only (.663). He was also named to the America East Championship All-Tournament team after averaging 10.3 points and shooting 72% from the field in three games.

On March 2, 2012, Joyner earned a spot in the Third-team All-America East.

== Professional career ==
In 2012, Joyner started his professional career with the Israeli team Maccabi Kiryat Bialik of the Israeli National League, where he averaged 16.2 points, 9 rebounds and 2.6 assists per game.

On July 22, 2013, Joyner signed a one-year deal with the Slovak team MBK Komárno. In 33 games played for Komárno, he averaged 11.7 points, 8.3 rebounds and 1.3 assists. Joyner helped Komárno to reach the 2014 Slovak League Semifinals, where they eventually were eliminated by Inter Bratislava.

In 2014, Joyner returned to Israel for a second stint, signing with Ironi Kiryat Ata. Joyner played three seasons for Kiryat Ata as he helped them reach the League Finals for two consecutive years. On June 1, 2016, Joyner was named All-Israeli National League Second Team by Eurobasket.com.

On March 14, 2017, Joyner recorded a double-double with a career-high 32 points and 16 rebounds, shooting 12-of-20 from the field, along with three assists and two steals in an 82–84 loss to Hapoel Haifa. In his third season with Kiryat Ata, he averaged 15.7 points, 9 rebounds, 2.2 assists and 1.2 blocks per game.

On June 12, 2017, Joyner joined the Colombian team Águilas de Tunja for the rest of the season.

On July 16, 2017, Joyner signed with Hapoel Kfar Saba for the 2017–18 season. In 29 games played for Kfar Saba, he averaged 16.1 points, 7.5 rebounds, 2.3 assists, 1.4 blocks and 1.3 steals in 31 minutes per game. Joyner helped Kfar Saba to reach the League Playoffs as the eighth seed, where they eventually were eliminated by Maccabi Kiryat Gat in the Quarterfinals.

On September 20, 2018, Joyner signed a one-month contract with Hapoel Tel Aviv for the 2018–19 Champions League Qualifying rounds after impressing during their training camp. One day later, he made his debut in a 76–73 win over Spirou Charleroi, recording 12 points and four rebounds off the bench. On October 5, 2018, Joyner parted ways with Hapoel after they were eliminated by Charleroi in the first qualifying round.

On October 8, 2018, Joyner signed a one-year deal with Elitzur Yavne as a replacement for Leron Black. In 13 games played for Yavne, he averaged 12.8 points, 6 rebounds and 1.6 assists per game. On January 11, 2019, Joyner parted ways with Yavne. Four days later, Joyner returned to Hapoel Kfar Saba for a second stint, signing for the rest of the season.

On September 27, 2019, Joyner signed with Hebraica Macabi of the Uruguayan Basketball League.
