= 2011–12 Stony Brook Seawolves men's basketball team =

American college basketball season

2011–12 Stony Brook Seawolves men's basketball

American East Regular Season Champions

NIT, First Round
- Conference: America East Conference
- Record: 22–10 (14–2 America East)
- Head coach: Steve Pikiell (7th season)
- Assistant coaches: Jay Young (7th season); Lamar Chapman; Dan Rickard
- Home arena: Pritchard Gymnasium

2011–12 America East men's basketball standings
| | Conf. | | | | Overall |
| Team | W | | L | PCT | W | | L | PCT |
|---|---|---|---|---|---|---|---|---|
| Stony Brook | 14 | – | 2 | .875 | 22 | – | 10 | .688 |
| Vermont † | 13 | – | 3 | .813 | 24 | – | 12 | .667 |
| Boston University | 12 | – | 4 | .750 | 16 | – | 16 | .500 |
| Albany | 9 | – | 7 | .563 | 19 | – | 15 | .559 |
| Hartford | 7 | – | 9 | .438 | 9 | – | 22 | .290 |
| New Hampshire | 7 | – | 9 | .438 | 13 | – | 16 | .448 |
| Maine | 6 | – | 10 | .375 | 12 | – | 17 | .414 |
| UMBC | 3 | – | 13 | .188 | 4 | – | 26 | .133 |
| Binghamton | 1 | – | 15 | .063 | 2 | – | 29 | .065 |
† 2012 America East tournament winner As of March 16, 2012; Rankings from AP Poll

The 2011–12 Stony Brook Seawolves men's basketball team represented Stony Brook University in the 2011–12 NCAA Division I men's basketball season. They were coached by seventh year head coach Steve Pikiell and played their home games at Pritchard Gymnasium. They are members of the America East Conference. The Seawolves were America East regular season champions but failed to win the America East Basketball Championship game for the second straight year. As regular season champions, they received an automatic bid into the 2012 NIT and faced Seton Hall in the first round.

== Previous season ==
The Seawolves were pre-season ranked second in the league, however, injures to most of their starters throughout the season largely affected the team. Tommy Brenton was out for the whole season due to injury and used a medical redshirt, Chris Martin also was injured most of the season, and other starters also suffered from injuries. The Seawolves struggled in the offensive end (ranked 337th in FG% in Division I), but were one of the top defensive teams in the NCAA allowing them to finish 5th in the America East with an 8–8 record. Despite the challenges in the offensive end, the Seawolves gained enough momentum to close the season with wins against Hartford and Binghamton. The Seawolves were ranked fifth in the 2011 America East tournament and went in an unlikely run to beat fourth seeded Albany, 67–61, and top seeded Vermont, 69–47, in back to back days at West Hartford, two teams who swept the Seawolves in the regular season series. For the first time in Seawolves Division I history they were to play in the America East Championship at second ranked Boston University. For most of the game, the Seawolves held to a substantial lead, and held a fifteen-point lead early in the fourth quarter. However, Boston rallied back with a late run to tie Stony Brook and take the lead with two seconds of regulation ending in a 56–54 loss for the Seawolves to end their season.

== Before the season ==
=== Losses ===
The Seawolves lost to graduation their sole senior Chris Martin. Early in the offseason, it was reported that Preye Preboye was officially released from the team and currently playing at the Division II level for Lynn University

=== Recruitment ===
College recruiting information
| Name | Hometown | School | Height | Weight | Commit date |
|---|---|---|---|---|---|
| Ron Bracey; G/F | Cincinnati, OH | Withrow HS/Kellogg Community College | 6 ft 5 in (1.96 m) | 220 lb (100 kg) | |
| Ron Bracey; G/F | Recruit ratings: No ratings found | | | | |
| Scott King; F | Plymouth, NH | Holderness HS | 6 ft 8 in (2.03 m) | 200 lb (91 kg) | |
| Scott King; F | Recruit ratings: No ratings found | | | | |
Overall recruit ranking:
Note: In many cases, Scout, Rivals, 247Sports, On3, and ESPN may conflict in their listings of height and weight.; In these cases, the average was taken. ESPN grades are on a 100-point scale.; Sources: "2011 Team Ranking". Rivals.

=== Preseason tour (Europe) ===
The Seawolves basketball program headed to Europe for their first ever international preseason trip. A five-game exhibition series was played in Dublin, Ireland, London, England, and in Paris, France from August 11 to the 21st in which the Seawolves faced professional teams from the leagues of each respective country. The Seawolves came out victorious in four of the five occasions. All five games were broadcast in WUSB.FM, the first time the Seawolves were broadcast from international grounds.

=== Ranking and polls ===
In October, the Seawolves were picked by multiple media outlets to finish #1 in the America East for the upcoming 2011–12 season. Sporting News College Basketball Preview magazine picked the Seawolves as #1 and also named Bryan Dougher a preseason All-America East. Lindy's College Basketball Preview echoed SNCBP announcements and CBSsports.com also picked the Seawolves to finish as regular season champions. The Seawolvesw were picked second in the Coaches Pre-season poll released in October 13, America East Tip-off, receiving 56 points and three first place votes against Boston U(defending tournament champions) 62 points and six first place votes.

== Honors ==
Bryan Dougher was announced to be in Preseason All-America East first team released in the America East Tip-Off Luncheon in October 13. Bryan Dougher and Tommy Brenton were selected to the First team All-Conference, in addition, Brenton was also selected to the All-Defensive team. Brenton was also announced to be the Defensive Player of the Year and head coach Steve Pikiell was awarded Coach of the Year, second time overall.

== Roster ==
2011–12 Stony Brook Seawolves men's basketball team
Players
Coaches

| Pos. | # | Name | Height | Weight | Year | Hometown |
|---|---|---|---|---|---|---|
| F | 2 | Danny Carter | 6 ft 9 in (2.06 m) | 225 lb (102 kg) | Sr | Windsor, England |
| G | 4 | Anthony Jackson | 6 ft 0 in (1.83 m) | 180 lb (82 kg) | So | Columbus, Ohio |
| G | 5 | Dave Coley | 6 ft 2 in (1.88 m) | 180 lb (82 kg) | So | Brooklyn, NY |
| G | 10 | Bryan Dougher (C) | 6 ft 1 in (1.85 m) | 190 lb (86 kg) | Sr | Scotch Plains, NJ |
| G | 11 | Ben Resner | 6 ft 3 in (1.91 m) | 185 lb (84 kg) | RS Jr | Farmingdale, NY |
| G | 12 | Marcus Rouse | 6 ft 0 in (1.83 m) | 170 lb (77 kg) | Jr | Upper Marlboro, MD |
| G | 12 | Leonard Hayes | 6 ft 4 in (1.93 m) | 185 lb (84 kg) | Jr | Voorhees, NJ |
| F | 21 | Al Rapier | 6 ft 7 in (2.01 m) | 220 lb (100 kg) | Sr | Chicago, Il |
| F | 22 | Eric McAlister | 6 ft 8 in (2.03 m) | 215 lb (98 kg) | RS So | Hightstown, NJ |
| F | 23 | Dallis Joyner (C) | 6 ft 7 in (2.01 m) | 270 lb (122 kg) | Sr | Norfolk, Va |
| G/F | 24 | Tommy Brenton (C) | 6 ft 5 in (1.96 m) | 220 lb (100 kg) | RS Jr | Columbia, MD |
| F | 32 | Anthony Mayo | 6 ft 9 in (2.06 m) | 210 lb (95 kg) | So | Philadelphia, PA |
| G/F | 1 | Ron Bracey | 6 ft 5 in (1.96 m) | 220 lb (100 kg) | Jr | Cincinnati, OH |
| F | 35 | Scott King | 6 ft 8 in (2.03 m) | 200 lb (91 kg) | RS Fr | Plymouth, NH |

Head coach

- Steve Pikiell

Assistant coach(es)

- Jay Young (Marist)
- Lamar Chapman
- Dan Rickard

Legend

- (C) Team captain
- (S) Suspended
- (I) Ineligible
- (W) Walk-on
- Injured
- Current redshirt

Roster
Last update: June 22, 2011

== Coaching ==
Coaching for the Stony Brook Seawolves remains the same, and no changes to those of the previous season. Pikiell will remain as the head coach with a contract extension through the 2015–16 season.

| Name | Type | College | Graduating year |
|---|---|---|---|
| Steve Pikiell | Head coach | Connecticut | 1990 |
| Jay Young | Associate head coach | Marist | 1986 |
| Lamar Chapman | Assistant coach | Lane | 1993 |
| Dan Rickard | Assistant coach | Stony Brook | 2004 |
| Ricky Lucas | Director of Basketball Operations | Stony Brook | 2008 |

== Schedule ==
In October 2011, Stony Brook announced a new partnership with New York cable provider Cablevision to broadcast 8 Men's basketball games and 3 Women's basketball games through the Optimum Network in the Long Island area. These games will be produced by Stony Brook and broadcast on Cablevision's Optimum Locals 118. Additionally, the MSG Network will regionally air the Rutgers matchup and ESPNU airing the Boston University game.

| Date time, TV | Rank^{#} | Opponent^{#} | Result | Record | Site (attendance) city, state |
European Tour (Exhibition)
| 08/13/2011; 1:30pm | | Killester | W 100–75 | | Irish Wheelchair Association; Dublin, Ireland |
| 08/14/2011; 10:00am | | UCD Marian | W 76–65 | | UCD Sports Centre; Dublin, Ireland |
| 08/17/2011; 2:00pm | | Midnight Madness | L 75–79 | | Crystal Palace National Indoor Arena; London, England |
| 08/18/2011; 10:00am | | MK Lions | W 84–60 | | MK Lions Arena; Milton Keynes |
| 08/20/2011; 10:00am | | Charenton | W 74–61 | | Complexe Nelson; Paris, France |
Regular Season
| 11/11/2011*; 7:00pm, BTN | | at Indiana | L 66–96 | 0–1 | Assembly Hall (16,506); Bloomington, IN |
| 11/13/2011*; 2:00pm | | Mount Ida | W 93–39 | 1–1 | Pritchard Gymnasium (1,301); Stony Brook, NY |
| 11/15/2011*; 7:00pm | | at Sacred Heart | L 63–74 | 1–2 | William H. Pitt Center (657); Fairfield, CT |
| 11/22/2011*; 7:00pm | | Columbia | W 67–53 | 2–2 | Pritchard Gymnasium (1,166); Stony Brook, NY |
| 11/25/2011*; 1:00pm, BTN Digital Network | | at Northwestern | L 58–63 | 2–3 | Welsh-Ryan Arena (4,608); Evanston, Il |
| 12/3/2011*; 3:00pm | | at Eastern Illinois | L 69–72 | 2–4 | Lantz Arena (876); Charleston, Il |
| 12/7/2011*; 7:00pm, IO 118 (Long Island) | | Fairleigh Dickinson | W 70–46 | 3–4 | Pritchard Gymnasium (1,078); Stony Brook, NY |
| 12/11/2011*; 5:00pm, ESPN3,NESN, YES | | at Boston College | L 51–66 | 3–5 | Conte Forum (3,426); Chestnut Hill, MA |
| 12/17/2011*; 12:00pm, MSG | | vs. Rutgers; Holiday Festival | L 58–67 | 3–6 | Madison Square Garden (N/A); New York, NY |
| 12/28/2011*; 7:00pm, IO 118 (Long Island) | | Cornell | W 68–59 ^{OT} | 4–6 | Pritchard Gymnasium (1,630); Stony Brook, NY |
| 12/30/2011*; 7:00pm | | Rider | W 79–62 | 5–6 | Pritchard Gymnasium (1,031); Stony Brook, NY |
| 01/02/2012; 7:00pm, IO 118 (Long Island) | | Vermont | W 65–59 | 6–6 (1–0) | Pritchard Gymnasium (1,088); Stony Brook, NY |
| 01/05/2012; 7:00pm | | at Binghamton | W 60–54 | 7–6 (2–0) | Events Center (1,740); Vestal, NY |
| 01/08/2012; 7:00pm, IO 118 (Long Island) | | Albany | W 81–68 | 8–6 (3–0) | Pritchard Gymnasium (1,355); Stony Brook, NY |
| 01/11/2012; 7:00pm | | at UMBC | W 89–49 | 9–6 (4–0) | Retriever Activities Center (1,229); Baltimore, MD |
| 01/14/2012; 1:00pm, ESPN3 | | at Boston University | L 55–61 | 9–7 (4–1) | Case Gym (578); Boston, MA |
| 01/16/2012; 5:00pm, IO 118 (Long Island) | | New Hampshire | W 61–52 | 10–7 (5–1) | Pritchard Gymnasium (1,331); Stony Brook, NY |
| 01/21/2012; 1:00pm | | at Maine | W 58–52 | 11–7 (6–1) | Memorial Gymnasium (1,172); Orono, ME |
| 01/25/2012; 7:00pm, IO 118 (Long Island) | | Hartford | W 60–37 | 12–7 (7–1) | Pritchard Gymnasium (1,377); Stony Brook, NY |
| 01/27/2012; 9:00pm, ESPNU | | Boston University | W 66–57 | 13–7 (8–1) | Pritchard Gymnasium (1,630); Stony Brook, NY |
| 02/01/2012; 1:00pm, IO 118 (Long Island) | | Binghamton | W 82–48 | 14–7 (9–1) | Pritchard Gymnasium (1,220); Stony Brook, NY |
| 02/04/2012; 7:00pm, TWCS | | at Albany | W 76–69 | 15–7 (10–1) | SEFCU Arena (4,538); Albany, NY |
| 02/06/2012; 7:00pm, ESPN3 | | at New Hampshire | W 57–48 | 16–7 (11–1) | Lundholm Gym (587); Durham, NH |
| 02/09/2012; 7:00pm, IO 118 (Long Island) | | UMBC | W 80–68 | 17–7 (12–1) | Pritchard Gymnasium (1,305); Stony Brook, NY |
| 02/12/2012; 1:00pm, CBS Sports Network | | at Vermont | L 49–68 | 17–8 (12–2) | Patrick Gym (3,266); Burlington, VT |
| 02/18/2012*; 1:00pm | | at Northeastern; Sears ESPN Bracketbuster | W 76–69 | 18–8 | Matthews Arena (873); Boston, MA |
| 02/21/2012; 1:00pm, CPTV | | at Hartford | W 74–50 | 19–8 (13–2) | Chase Arena at RFP (1,641); Hartford, CT |
| 02/26/2012; 12:00pm, CBS Sports Network | | Maine | W 55–48 | 20–8 (14–2) | Pritchard Gymnasium (1,630); Stony Brook, NY |
2012 America East tournament
| 03/03/2012; 12:00pm, AETV | (1) | vs. (9) Binghamton; Quarterfinals | W 78–69 | 21–8 | Chase Arena at RFP (1,981); Hartford, CT |
| 03/04/2012; 5:00pm, ESPN3 | (1) | vs. (4) Albany; Semifinals | W 57–55 | 22–8 | Chase Arena at RFP (2,644); Hartford, CT |
| 03/10/2012; 11:00am, ESPN2 | (1) | (2) Vermont; Championship Game | L 43–51 | 22–9 | Stony Brook Arena (4,423); Stony Brook, NY |
2012 NIT
| 03/13/2012*; 7:15pm, ESPN3 | (8 S) | at (1 S) Seton Hall; First Round | L 61–63 | 22–10 | Walsh Gymnasium (1,674); South Orange, NJ |
*Non-conference game. ^{#}Rankings from AP Poll. (#) Tournament seedings in parentheses.
