= Hapoel Kfar Saba B.C. =

Hapoel Kfar Saba
- Leagues: Liga Artzit
- Founded: 1957; 69 years ago
- Arena: Hashalom Hall
- Location: Kfar Saba
- Team colors: Green and white
Uniform	Uniform

Hapoel Kfar Saba (Hebrew: הפועל כפר סבא) is a professional basketball club based in Kfar Saba in the Sharon region, Central District of Israel. The team plays in the Liga Artzit.

== History ==
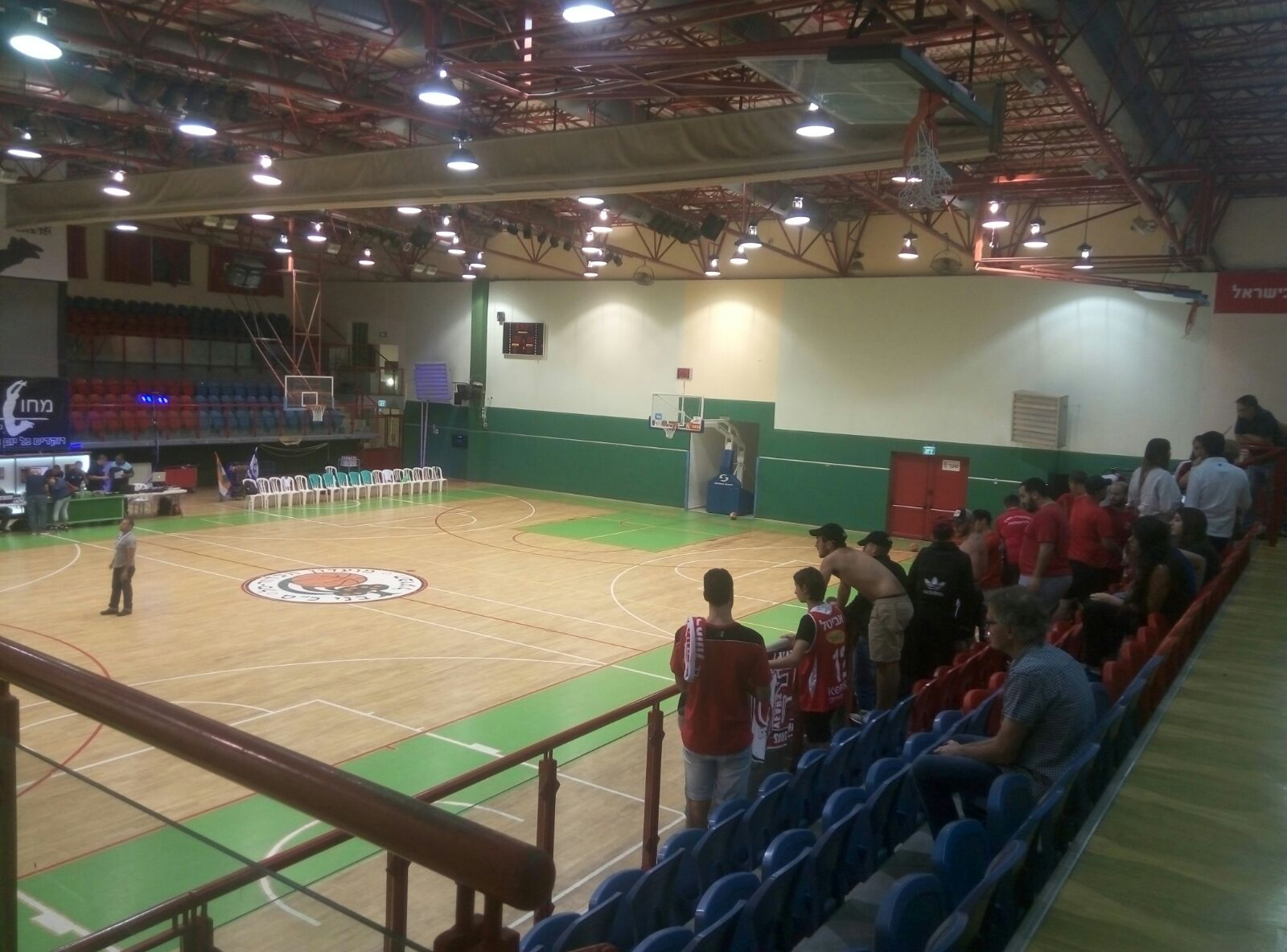
HaYovel Hall in Kfar Saba

Hapoel Kfar Saba was founded in 1957 and played in the Liga Artzit (the third-tier division).

In 2009, Kfar Saba was merged with Elitzur Kohav Yair. Since then, it has played in the Liga Leumit (the second-tier division).

In the 2016–17 season, Kfar Saba reached the Liga Leumit playoffs as the second seed, but lost to Hapoel Be'er Sheva in the semifinals.

In the 2017–18 season, Kfar Saba reached the Liga Leumit playoffs as the eighth seed, but lost to Maccabi Kiryat Gat in the quarterfinals.

In the 2018–19 season, Kfar Saba were relegated to the Liga Artzit, the third tier of Israeli basketball.

== Season by season ==
Season	Tier	League	Pos	Israeli State Cup
2016–17	2	Liga Leumit	3rd	First round
2017–18	2	Liga Leumit	8th	First round
2018–19	2	Liga Leumit	14th	

== Notable players ==
Note: Flags indicate national team eligibility at FIBA-sanctioned events. Players may hold other non-FIBA nationalities not displayed.

Criteria

To appear in this section a player must have either:

- Set a club record or won an individual award while at the club
- Played at least one official international match for their national team at any time
- Played at least one official NBA match at any time.

- (United States) Errick McCollum
- (United States) Murphy Holloway
- (United States) Dallis Joyner
- (United States) Denzel Livingston
- (United States) Byron Wesley
- (United States) (Israel) Terrence Watson
- (United States) Vernon Goodridge
- (United States) Shannon Shorter
- (United States) Darrin Dorsey
- (United States) Leslie McDonald
- (Israel) Shlomi Harush
- (Israel) Roi Huber
- (Israel) Nimrod Levi
