= 2011–12 UMBC Retrievers men's basketball team =

American college basketball season

2011–12 UMBC Retrievers men's basketball
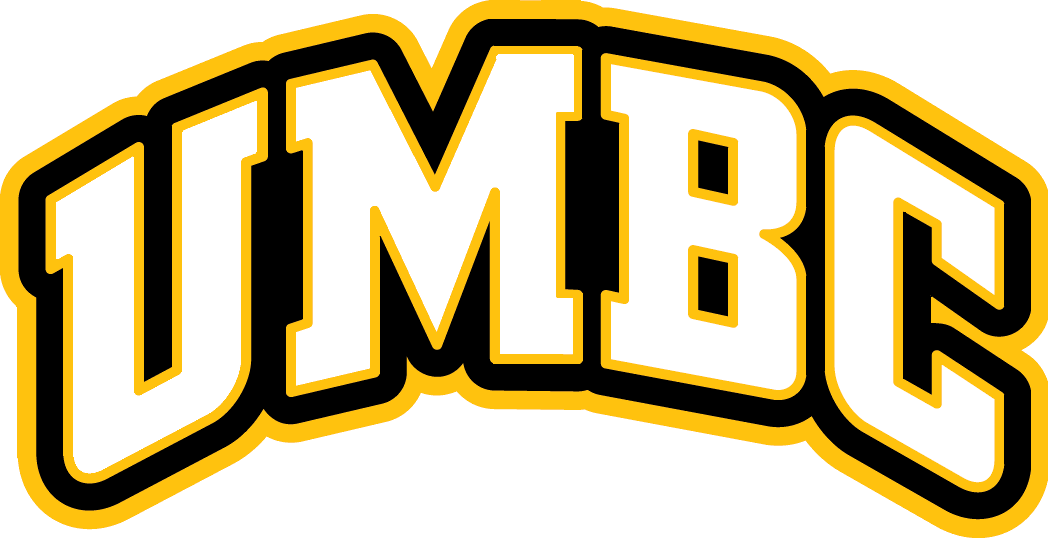
- Conference: America East Conference
- Record: 4–26 (3–13 AEC)
- Head coach: Randy Monroe (8th season)
- Home arena: UMBC Event Center (capacity: 5000)

2011–12 America East men's basketball standings
	Conf.				Overall
Team	W		L	PCT	W		L	PCT
Stony Brook	14	–	2	.875	22	–	10	.688
Vermont †	13	–	3	.813	24	–	12	.667
Boston University	12	–	4	.750	16	–	16	.500
Albany	9	–	7	.563	19	–	15	.559
Hartford	7	–	9	.438	9	–	22	.290
New Hampshire	7	–	9	.438	13	–	16	.448
Maine	6	–	10	.375	12	–	17	.414
UMBC	3	–	13	.188	4	–	26	.133
Binghamton	1	–	15	.063	2	–	29	.065
† 2012 America East tournament winner As of March 16, 2012; Rankings from AP Poll

The 2011–12 UMBC Retrievers men's basketball team represented the University of Maryland, Baltimore County in the 2011–12 NCAA Division I men's basketball season. The team competed in the America East Conference (AEC) and was led by eighth-year head coach Randy Monroe.
