= 1987 ECAC North men's basketball tournament =

- Classification: Division I
- Season: 1986–87
- Teams: 8
- Champions: Northeastern (6th title)
- Winning coach: Karl Fogel (1st title)
- MVP: Reggie Lewis (Northeastern)
- ECAC North men's basketball tournaments

1986–87 ECAC North men's basketball standings
	Conf.				Overall
Team	W		L	PCT	W		L	PCT
Northeastern †	17	–	1	.944	27	–	7	.794
Niagara	14	–	4	.778	21	–	10	.677
Boston University	12	–	6	.667	18	–	12	.600
Canisius	12	–	6	.667	16	–	12	.571
Siena	12	–	6	.667	17	–	12	.586
Hartford	8	–	10	.444	14	–	14	.500
Maine	6	–	12	.333	10	–	18	.357
Vermont	3	–	15	.167	5	–	23	.179
New Hampshire	3	–	15	.167	4	–	24	.143
Colgate	3	–	15	.167	4	–	23	.148
† 1987 ECAC North tournament winner Rankings from AP Poll

The 1987 America East men's basketball tournament was hosted by the higher seeds in head-to-head matchups. The final was held at Matthews Arena on the campus of the Northeastern University. Only the top-8 schools made it to the 1987 tournament, therefore excluding both Colgate and Hartford. Northeastern gained its fourth consecutive and sixth overall America East Conference Championship and an automatic berth to the NCAA tournament with its win over Boston University. Northeastern was given the 14th seed in the East Regional of the NCAA Tournament and lost in the first round to Purdue 104–95. Niagara University gained a bid to the NIT and lost in the second round to La Salle 89–81, after beating Seton Hall 74–65.

== Bracket and Results ==
Quarterfinals
1	Northeastern	85
8	New Hampshire	71
4	Canisius	65
5	Siena	67
3	Boston U.	76
6	Maine	57
2	Niagara	109
7	Vermont	90

Semifinals
1	Northeastern	89
5	Siena	79
3	Boston U.	84
2	Niagara	82

Finals
1	Northeastern	71
3	Boston U.	68

== See also ==
- America East Conference
