= 2011–12 Albany Great Danes men's basketball team =

American college basketball season

2011–12 Albany Great Danes men's basketball

CIT, First Round
- Conference: America East Conference
- Record: 19–15 (9–7 America East)
- Head coach: Will Brown (11th season)
- Assistant coaches: Jeremy Friel; Chad O'Donnell; Brent Wilson
- Home arena: SEFCU Arena

2011–12 America East men's basketball standings
| | Conf. | | | | Overall |
| Team | W | | L | PCT | W | | L | PCT |
|---|---|---|---|---|---|---|---|---|
| Stony Brook | 14 | – | 2 | .875 | 22 | – | 10 | .688 |
| Vermont † | 13 | – | 3 | .813 | 24 | – | 12 | .667 |
| Boston University | 12 | – | 4 | .750 | 16 | – | 16 | .500 |
| Albany | 9 | – | 7 | .563 | 19 | – | 15 | .559 |
| Hartford | 7 | – | 9 | .438 | 9 | – | 22 | .290 |
| New Hampshire | 7 | – | 9 | .438 | 13 | – | 16 | .448 |
| Maine | 6 | – | 10 | .375 | 12 | – | 17 | .414 |
| UMBC | 3 | – | 13 | .188 | 4 | – | 26 | .133 |
| Binghamton | 1 | – | 15 | .063 | 2 | – | 29 | .065 |
† 2012 America East tournament winner As of March 16, 2012; Rankings from AP Poll

The 2011–12 Albany Great Danes men's basketball team represented the University at Albany, SUNY during the 2011–12 NCAA Division I men's basketball season. The Great Dames, led by 11th-year head coach Will Brown, played their home games at SEFCU Arena and are members of the America East Conference. They finished the season 19–15, 9–7 in America East play to finish in fourth place. They lost in the semifinals of the America East Basketball tournament to Stony Brook. They were invited to the 2012 CollegeInsider.com Tournament, where they lost in the first round to Manhattan.

== Roster ==
| Number | Name | Position | Height | Weight | Year | Hometown |
|---|---|---|---|---|---|---|
| 0 | Jacob Iati | Guard | 5–10 | 175 | Junior | York, Pennsylvania |
| 1 | Tanner Gibson | Freshman | 6–2 | 180 | Freshman | Zanesville, Ohio |
| 2 | Logan Aronhalt | Guard | 6–3 | 210 | Junior | Zanesville, Ohio |
| 10 | Mike Black | Guard | 6–0 | 175 | Junior | Chicago, Illinois |
| 11 | Luke Devlin | Forward | 6–8 | 230 | Sophomore | Sydney, Australia |
| 12 | Peter Hooley | Guard | 6–4 | 195 | Freshman | Hahndorf, South Australia |
| 14 | Sam Rowley | Forward | 6–5 | 230 | Freshman | Sydney, Australia |
| 20 | Gerardo Suero | Guard | 6–4 | 205 | Junior | Santo Domingo, Dominican Republic |
| 21 | Blake Metcalf | Center | 6–9 | 240 | Junior | Camby, Indiana |
| 22 | Ralph Watts | Guard/forward | 6–5 | 205 | Sophomore | Peekskill, New York |
| 24 | Chris Page | Guard | 6–5 | 185 | Freshman | Plainfield, Indiana |
| 30 | Jayson Guerrier | Guard/forward | 6–4 | 205 | Junior | Winter Springs, Florida |
| 44 | John Puk | Center | 6–10 | 265 | Sophomore | Waterloo, Iowa |

== Schedule ==
| Date time, TV | Rank^{#} | Opponent^{#} | Result | Record | Site (attendance) city, state |
Exhibition Tour of Canada
| 08/19/2011*; 7:00 pm | | vs. Université du Québec à Montréal | W 86–57 | | Montreal, QC |
| 08/20/2011*; 7:00 pm | | vs. McGill University | W 83–58 | | Montreal, QC |
| 08/22/2011*; 7:30 pm | | vs. Dawson College | L 86–90 | | Montreal, QC |
| 08/24/2011*; 8:00 pm | | vs. University of Ottawa | W 97–85 | | Ottawa, ON |
| 08/25/2011*; 7:00 pm | | vs. Carleton University | W 91–81 | | Ottawa, ON |
Regular season
| 11/11/2011*; 7:00 pm, SNY | | at No. 10 Pittsburgh | L 56–89 | 0–1 | Petersen Events Center (10,125); Pittsburgh, PA |
| 11/14/2011*; 4:00 pm | | vs. Brown; NIT Season Tip-Off | W 77–68 | 1–1 | Carrier Dome (NA); Syracuse, NY |
| 11/15/2011*; 7:00 pm, ESPN3 | | at No. 5 Syracuse; NIT Season Tip-Off | L 74–98 | 1–2 | Carrier Dome (17,189); Syracuse, NY |
| 11/21/2011*; 5:00 pm | | vs. Monmouth; NIT Season Tip-Off | W 85–49 | 2–2 | Patriot Center (NA); Fairfax, VA |
| 11/22/2011*; 7:30 pm | | at George Mason; NIT Season Tip-Off | L 46–66 | 2–3 | Patriot Center (1,384); Fairfax, VA |
| 11/25/2011*; 4:00 pm | | Navy | W 69–62 | 3–3 | SEFCU Arena (3,037); Albany, NY |
| 11/27/2011*; 4:00 pm | | Fairleigh Dickinson | W 81–62 | 4–3 | SEFCU Arena (1,623); Albany, NY |
| 12/05/2011*; 7:00 pm, TWCSN | | at Siena | L 60–64 | 4–4 | Times Union Center (8,252); Albany, NY |
| 12/07/2011*; 7:00 pm, TWCSN | | Colgate | W 87–63 | 5–4 | SEFCU Arena (2,584); Albany, NY |
| 12/17/2011*; 2:00 pm | | at Cornell | L 82–85 | 5–5 | Newman Arena (1,477); Ithaca, NY |
| 12/19/2011*; 7:00 pm | | at St. Francis | W 76–64 | 6–5 | Generoso Pope Athletic Complex (935); Brooklyn, NY |
| 12/23/2011*; 2:00 pm | | Dartmouth | W 82–74 | 7–5 | SEFCU Arena (1,861); Albany, NY |
| 12/28/2011*; 8:00 pm | | at Maryland | L 72–83 | 7–6 | Comcast Center (11,751); College Park, MD |
| 12/31/2011*; 4:00 pm | | at Mount St. Mary's | W 65–64 | 8–6 | Knott Arena (800); Emmitsburg, MD |
| 01/02/2012; 7:00 pm | | Hartford | W 88–63 | 9–6 (1–0) | SEFCU Arena (2,147); Albany, NY |
| 01/05/2012; 7:00 pm | | at UMBC | W 89–72 | 10–6 (2–0) | Retriever Activities Center (1,373); Baltimore, MD |
| 01/08/2012; 2:00 pm | | at Stony Brook | L 68–81 | 10–7 (2–1) | Pritchard Gymnasium (1,355); Stony Brook, NY |
| 01/11/2012; 7:00 pm, TWCSN | | New Hampshire | W 86–63 | 11–7 (3–1) | SEFCU Arena (2,388); Albany, NY |
| 01/14/2012; 7:00 pm | | Maine | W 76–75 | 12–7 (4–1) | SEFCU Arena (2,853); Albany, NY |
| 01/16/2012; 7:00 pm, CBSSN | | at Boston University | L 57–70 | 12–8 (4–2) | Case Gym (852); Boston, MA |
| 01/19/2012; 7:00 pm, ESPN3 | | at Vermont | L 69–73 | 12–9 (4–3) | Patrick Gym (2,260); Burlington, VT |
| 01/25/2012; 7:00 pm, TWCSN | | Binghamton | W 74–68 | 13–9 (5–3) | SEFCU Arena (3,146); Albany, NY |
| 01/28/2012; 4:00 pm | | at Hartford | W 72–60 | 14–9 (6–3) | Chase Arena at RFP (1,699); Hartford, CT |
| 02/01/2012; 7:00 pm | | UMBC | W 87–76 | 15–9 (7–3) | SEFCU Arena (2,810); Albany, NY |
| 02/04/2012; 7:00 pm, TWCSN | | Stony Brook | L 69–76 | 15–10 (7–4) | SEFCU Arena (4,538); Albany, NY |
| 02/06/2012; 7:00 pm | | Boston University | L 78–81 | 15–11 (7–5) | SEFCU Arena (2,280); Albany, NY |
| 02/09/2012; 7:00 pm, ESPN3 | | at New Hampshire | L 64–69 | 15–12 (7–6) | Lundholm Gym (665); Durham, NH |
| 02/11/2012; 2:00 pm | | at Maine | W 76–68 | 16–12 (8–6) | Memorial Gymnasium (1,175); Orono, ME |
| 02/15/2012; 7:00 pm, TWCSN | | Vermont | L 47–50 | 16–13 (8–7) | SEFCU Arena (2,811); Albany, NY |
| 02/18/2012*; 7:00 pm | | Rider; ESPN BracketBusters | W 70–61 | 17–13 | SEFCU Arena (2,190); Albany, NY |
| 02/23/2012; 7:00 pm, ESPN3 | | at Binghamton | W 74–63 | 18–13 (9–7) | Binghamton University Events Center (3,548); Vestal, NY |
America East tournament
| 03/03/2012; 2:15 pm, ESPN3 | | vs. New Hampshire; Quarterfinals | W 63–45 | 19–13 | Chase Arena at RFP (1,981); Hartford, CT |
| 03/04/2012; 5:00 pm, ESPN3 | | vs. Stony Brook; Semifinals | L 55–57 | 19–14 | Chase Arena at RFP (2,644); Hartford, CT |
CollegeInsider.com Postseason Tournament
| 03/14/2012*; 7:00 pm | | Manhattan; First Round | L 79–89 | 19–15 | SEFCU Arena (458); Albany, NY |
*Non-conference game. ^{#}Rankings from AP Poll. (#) Tournament seedings in parentheses. All times are in Eastern Time.
