= 2011–12 Binghamton Bearcats men's basketball team =

American college basketball season

2011–12 Binghamton Bearcats men's basketball
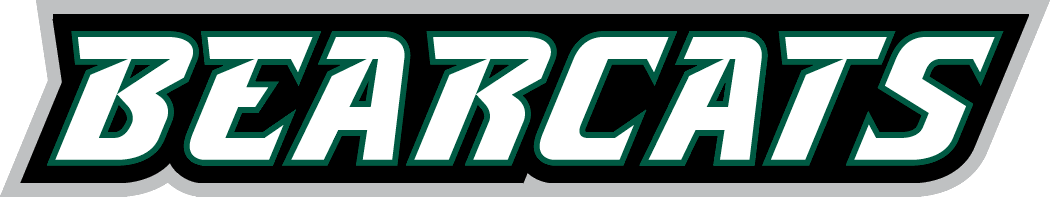
- Conference: America East Conference
- Record: 2–29 (1–15 America East)
- Head coach: Mark Macon (3rd season)
- Assistant coaches: Ron Brown; Julius Smith
- Home arena: Binghamton University Events Center

2011–12 America East men's basketball standings
	Conf.				Overall
Team	W		L	PCT	W		L	PCT
Stony Brook	14	–	2	.875	22	–	10	.688
Vermont †	13	–	3	.813	24	–	12	.667
Boston University	12	–	4	.750	16	–	16	.500
Albany	9	–	7	.563	19	–	15	.559
Hartford	7	–	9	.438	9	–	22	.290
New Hampshire	7	–	9	.438	13	–	16	.448
Maine	6	–	10	.375	12	–	17	.414
UMBC	3	–	13	.188	4	–	26	.133
Binghamton	1	–	15	.063	2	–	29	.065
† 2012 America East tournament winner As of March 16, 2012; Rankings from AP Poll

The 2011–12 Binghamton Bearcats men's basketball team represented Binghamton University during the 2011–12 NCAA Division I men's basketball season. The Bearcats, led by third-year head coach Mark Macon, played their home games at the Binghamton University Events Center in Vestal, New York as members of the America East Conference.

The team finished with a record of 2–29, the worst in program history, and finished last in America East play with a 1–15 conference record. Binghamton began the season by losing 26 consecutive games and were the final remaining winless team in Division I. The Bearcats ended the regular season at 1–28. They defeated UMBC in the first round of the 2012 America East men's basketball tournament before losing to Stony Brook to end their season. The Bearcats' .065 winning percentage ranked 343rd out of 344 Division I programs, ahead of just Towson's 1–31 (.031) record.

In the aftermath of the Bearcats' historically inept season, Macon was fired and replaced by Tommy Dempsey. Freshman forward Ben Dickinson and freshman guard Chris Longoria both transferred to other programs as a result.

== Previous season ==
In Mark Macon's second season as Binghamton head coach, the Bearcats struggled to remain competitive following the fallout from the scandal. The team finished 8–23, tied for eighth in the America East with a 4–12 conference record. The Bearcats earned the ninth seed in the 2011 America East men's basketball tournament, beating eighth-seeded UMBC 91–65 in the first round before losing to Vermont 57–46 in the semifinals.

== Roster ==
Number	Name	Position	Height	Weight	Year	Hometown
0	Storm Clonch	Guard	6–5	195	Freshman	North Wilkesboro, North Carolina
2	Robert Mansell	Guard	6–4	200	Sophomore	Philadelphia, Pennsylvania
10	K.J. Brown	Guard	6–1	190	Sophomore	Sicklerville, New Jersey
11	Byron Brown	Guard	5–7	160	Sophomore	Buffalo, New York
14	Ben Dickinson	Forward	6–9	230	Freshman	Alexandria, Virginia
15	Alex Ogundadegbe	Forward	6–8	235	Sophomore	Bowie, Maryland
20	Jimmy Gray	Guard	6–0	175	Junior	Binghamton, New York
21	Chris Longoria	Guard	6–4	180	Freshman	Peachtree, Georgia
21	Javon Ralling	Forward	6–6	225	Junior	New York, New York
22	Taylor Johnston	Forward	6–7	210	Junior	Whitby, Ontario, Canada
22	Omar Richards	Forward	6–8	220	Freshman	San Diego, California
23	Chris Rice	Guard	6–3	195	Freshman	Sicklerville, New Jersey
24	Mike Horn	Guard	6–0	185	Junior	Woodcliff Lake, New Jersey
32	Jabrille Williams	Forward	6–6	190	Freshman	Stamford, Connecticut
34	Carlyle Francis	Guard	6–2	185	Junior	Scarborough, Toronto, Canada

Note: Senior Kyrie Sutton, the last remaining player from Binghamton's 2009 champion squad, was dismissed from the team in November after he was arrested for the misdemeanor of criminal possession of stolen property.

== Schedule ==
Date time, TV	Opponent	Result	Record	Site (attendance) city, state
Exhibition
11/07/2011*; 7:00 pm	Mansfield	W 79–64		Binghamton University Events Center; Vestal, NY
Non-Conference Regular Season
11/12/2011*; 7:00 pm	Colgate	L 74–78	0–1	Binghamton University Events Center (4,760); Vestal, NY
11/14/2011*; 7:00 pm	at Cornell	L 61–76	0–2	Newman Arena (2,216); Ithaca, NY
11/18/2011*; 7:00 pm	at Fordham	L 49–64	0–3	Rose Hill Gymnasium (2,162); Bronx, NY
11/20/2011*; 7:00 pm	at Saint Peter's	L 43–66	0–4	Yanitelli Center (778); Jersey City, NJ
11/27/2011*; 3:00 pm	at No. 21 Missouri	L 59–88	0–5	Mizzou Arena (5,037); Columbia, MO
12/3/2011*; 7:00 pm	Army	L 50–70	0–6	Binghamton University Events Center (3,162); Vestal, NY
12/6/2011*; 7:00 pm	Bucknell	L 63–77	0–7	Binghamton University Events Center (2,078); Vestal, NY
12/17/2011*; 4:00 pm	at Hofstra	L 62–82	0–8	Mack Sports Complex (2,027); Hempstead, NY
12/19/2011*; 8:15 pm	Morehead State	L 45–64	0–9	Binghamton University Events Center (3,712); Vestal, NY
12/22/2011*; 7:00 pm	Drexel	L 44–68	0–10	Binghamton University Events Center (1,895); Vestal, NY
12/28/2011*; 7:30 pm	at Canisius	L 66–75	0–11	Koessler Athletic Center (1,331); Buffalo, NY
12/30/2011*; 7:00 pm	Manhattan	L 51–94	0–12	Binghamton University Events Center (2,131); Vestal, NY
America East Regular Season
1/2/2012; 7:00 pm	Maine	L 61–76	0–13 (0–1)	Binghamton University Events Center (1,893); Vestal, NY
1/5/2012; 7:00 pm	Stony Brook	L 54–60	0–14 (0–2)	Binghamton University Events Center (1,740); Vestal, NY
1/8/2012; 3:00 pm	at Boston	L 49–68	0–15 (0–3)	Case Gym (523); Boston, MA
1/12/2012; 7:00 pm	at Vermont	L 53–73	0–16 (0–4)	Patrick Gym (1,931); Burlington, VT
1/15/2012; 7:00 pm	Hartford	L 57–69	0–17 (0–5)	Binghamton University Events Center (2,188); Vestal, NY
1/19/2012; 7:00 pm	at UMBC	L 58–64	0–18 (0–6)	Retriever Activities Center (1,305); Baltimore, MD
1/22/2012; 7:00 pm	New Hampshire	L 49–64	0–19 (0–7)	Binghamton University Events Center (3,691); Vestal, NY
1/25/2012; 7:00 pm	at Albany	L 68–74	0–20 (0–8)	SEFCU Arena (3,146); Albany, NY
1/28/2012; 2:00 pm	at Maine	L 59–67	0–21 (0–9)	Alfond Arena (1,902); Orono, ME
2/1/2012; 7:00 pm	at Stony Brook	L 48–82	0–22 (0–10)	Pritchard Gymnasium (1,220); Stony Brook, NY
2/4/2012; 7:00 pm	Boston	L 53–68	0–23 (0–11)	Binghamton University Events Center (3,232); Vestal, NY
2/12/2012; 7:00 pm	at Hartford	L 60–62	0–24 (0–12)	Chase Arena at Reich Family Pavilion (1,249); Hartford, CT
2/15/2012; 7:00 pm	UMBC	L 56–70	0–25 (0–13)	Binghamton University Events Center (2,483); Vestal, NY
2/18/2012*; 4:00 pm	at Radford	L 59–64	0–26	Donald N. Dedmon Center (863); Radford, VA
2/21/2012; 7:00 pm	Vermont	W 57–53	1–26 (1–13)	Binghamton University Events Center; Vestal, NY
2/23/2012; 7:00 pm	Albany	L 63–74	1–27 (1–14)	Binghamton University Events Center (3,548); Vestal, NY
2/26/2018; 7:00 pm	at New Hampshire	L 49–58	1–28 (1–15)	Lundholm Gym (1,033); Durham, NH
America East Tournament
3/1/2012; 8:15 pm	vs. UMBC; First Round	W 73–67 ^{OT}	2–28	Chase Arena at Reich Family Pavilion (1,258); Hartford, CT
3/3/2012; 12:05 pm, ESPN3	vs. Stony Brook; Quarterfinals	L 69–78	2–29	Chase Arena at Reich Family Pavilion (4,017); Hartford, CT
*Non-conference game. ^{#}Rankings from AP Poll. (#) Tournament seedings in parentheses. All times are in Eastern Time.
