= Peter Hooley =

Australian basketball player

- Hooley in 2026

Personal information
- Born: 5 February 1992 (age 34)
- Listed height: 193 cm (6 ft 4 in)
- Listed weight: 91 kg (201 lb)

Career information
- High school: Concordia College (Adelaide, South Australia)
- College: Albany (2011–2016)
- NBA draft: 2016: undrafted
- Playing career: 2016–2021
- Position: Shooting guard

Career history
- 2016–2017: Plymouth Raiders
- 2017–2018: Ballarat Miners
- 2017–2019: Melbourne United
- 2019: Kilsyth Cobras
- 2021: Nunawading Spectres

Career highlights
- NBL champion (2018); SEABL All-Star Five (2017, 2018); 2× Second-team All-America East (2014, 2015); Third-team All-America East (2016); 2× America East tournament MVP (2014, 2015)

Peter Jeffrey Hooley (born 5 February 1992) is an Australian sports broadcaster and former professional basketball player. He played college basketball for the University at Albany and professionally in the National Basketball League (NBL). Hooley is a host of commentary show NBL Overtime.

== College career ==
Hooley played for the Albany Great Danes from 2011 to 2016. He was a standout player for the team, earning All-America East honors three times and the America East tournament Reggie Lewis Most Outstanding Performer honors in 2014 and 2015. While attending the University at Albany, SUNY Hooley finished as the America East Conference men's basketball scholar athlete of the year twice, following the 2013–14 and 2015–16 seasons.

=== Freshman Campaign ===
Hooley would receive a medical redshirt for the 2011-12 basketball season after only appearing in four games due to a stress fracture on the right foot. During the 2012–13 season Hooley would tally nine double digit scoring games, including new career highs of 18 points and 12 rebounds as the Albany Great Danes visited the Hartford Hawks men's basketball program for a regular season conference matchup. Hooley would finish his Freshman campaign with 263 points, 102 assists and 111 rebounds in 858 minutes as Albany won the America East Conference men's basketball tournament and returned to the NCAA Division I men's basketball tournament for the first time since 2007.

=== Sophomore Campaign ===
During 2013–14 season for Albany, Hooley would start 32 of the 33 games he appeared in averaging 35.1 minutes per game. The only game he would not start would be on Senior Night, when Albany coach Will Brown elected to start all seniors in the Great Danes' final regular season home game. Hooley would reach a new career high for points in a game several times throughout the season, peaking with a 30-point outing as Albany defeated UMBC in the first round of the America East tournament. In total, Hooley would accumulate 10 games in which he scored at least 20 points and 25 games in which he scored in double figures, on his way to averaging a team high 15.5 points per contest. Hooley would tally 512 points, 87 assists and 89 rebounds for the season as the Albany Great Danes men's basketball team repeated as America East tournament champions; punching their ticket to the 2014 NCAA Division I men's basketball tournament with a 69–60 victory over the Stony Brook Seawolves men's basketball program. Hooley would be named the America East Conference men's basketball tournament Reggie Lewis Most Outstanding Player for the first time in his career.

=== Junior Campaign ===
Hooley missed 9 games for Albany during the 2014–15 season including 8 straight America East Conference games as he returned to Australia to be with his ailing mother. His mother, Sue Hooley, would die after a 4 1/2-year battle with colon cancer on 30 January 2015. Hooley, who would later state "I always played for her before all of this", would eventually continue to do just that. On 13 February 2015 he returned to the court for Albany, recording his 1000th career point in a six-point Great Dane's victory at NJIT. With only five games remaining in the regular season, Hooley would ease his way back into the rotation for Albany, averaging 24.2 minutes per game while coming off of the bench.

In a 60-58 America East Conference men's basketball tournament semifinal victory over the University of New Hampshire Hooley would come off of the bench and record a game high 21 points in 35 minutes of action. With the Albany Great Danes men's basketball program once again facing the Stony Brook Seawolves in the America East tournament finals, Hooley would hit Albany's only three pointer of the game with 1.6 seconds left to give Albany their third consecutive America East Conference men's basketball tournament championship in a 51–50 triumph. When asked about the shot after the game, Hooley referred to his late mother Sue stating "When you've got angels watching you, you can do anything"

Hooley finished his Junior season with 329 points, 72 rebounds and 56 assists in 781 minutes, while winning his second consecutive America East tournament Reggie Lewis Most Outstanding Player award.

=== Senior Campaign ===
Hooley would appear in and start all 33 of Albany's games during the 2015–16 season, scoring in double figures in 19, while totaling 411 points, 90 assists and 153 rebounds for the season. He would finish his Albany career with 1,519 points, 336 assists and 426 rebounds. Hooley remains only the second Albany Men's Basketball player to win multiple Reggie Lewis Most Outstanding Player Awards, while he and teammate Sam Rowley are the only two Albany Great Danes men's basketball players to have reached the NCAA Division I men's basketball tournament three times in their career.

Hooley currently sits seventh all time for Albany Great Danes men's basketball players in career points (1,519), sixth in games played (126), tied for fourth in games started (92), fourth in free throw's made (410), eighth in free throw percentage (80.2%) and sixth in three point field goal's made (181).

=== College Statistics ===
Career Totals
Season	G	GS	MP	FG	FGA	3P	3PA	3P%	FT	FTA	FT%	TRB	AST	STL	PTS
2011-12	4	0	24	2	9	0	5	.000	0	0		1	2	3	4
2012-13	33	11	858	81	194	25	71	.352	76	93	.817	111	102	25	263
2013-14	33	32	1157	143	359	71	183	.388	155	182	.852	89	87	27	512
2014-15	24	16	781	108	252	45	132	.341	68	90	.756	72	56	13	329
2015-16	33	33	1085	130	343	40	164	.244	111	146	.760	153	90	31	411
Career	127	90	3905	464	1157	181	555	.326	410	511	.802	426	337	99	1519

America East Conference Averages
Season	G	GS	MP	FG	FGA	FG%	3PA	3P%	FTA	FT%	TRB	AST	STL	PTS
2012-13	15	11	29.0	2.9	7.1	.411	2.5	.297	3.1	.783	4.2	3.7	0.4	9.0
2013-14	15	14	34.7	4.3	10.5	.411	5.9	.420	4.9	.877	2.9	2.9	0.7	15.4
2014-15	8	4	28.6	4.5	8.9	.507	4.4	.457	3.3	.731	1.4	2.1	0.4	13.4
2015-16	16	16	33.5	4.5	10.9	.414	5.1	.293	3.8	.738	5.1	2.6	0.9	13.3
Career	54	43	31.9	4.0	9.4	.425	4.5	.364	3.8	.796	3.7	2.9	0.6	12.7

== Professional career ==
Following the close of his college career, Hooley signed with the Plymouth Raiders of the British Basketball League for the 2016–17 season. He left the team in February 2017 after averaging six points in 11 games.

Hooley joined the Ballarat Miners of the South East Australian Basketball League (SEABL) for the 2017 season. He averaged 20.6 points and 4.5 assists per game for the Miners, earning All-Star Five honours.

In August 2017, Hooley signed with Melbourne United of the National Basketball League (NBL) for the 2017–18 season as an injury replacement for Daniel Dillon. He re-joined the Miners for the 2018 SEABL season and then had a second season with United in 2018–19.

In 2019, Hooley joined the Kilsyth Cobras of the NBL1 for the league's inaugural season. He played for the Nunawading Spectres during the 2021 NBL1 season.

== Broadcasting career ==
Hooley joined the NBL commentary team for the 2019–20 season. He was appointed as a panelist on commentary show NBL Overtime in 2024.
