= 2012 America East men's basketball tournament =

- Classification: Division I
- Season: 2011–12
- Teams: 9
- First round site: Chase Arena at Reich Family Pavilion; West Hartford, CT
- Quarterfinals site: Chase Arena at Reich Family Pavilion; West Hartford, CT
- Semifinals site: Chase Arena at Reich Family Pavilion; West Hartford, CT
- Finals site: Stony Brook University Arena; Stony Brook, NY
- Champions: Vermont (5th title)
- Winning coach: John Becker (1st title)
- MVP: Brian Voelkel (Vermont)
- Attendance: 4,423

2011–12 America East men's basketball standings
	Conf.				Overall
Team	W		L	PCT	W		L	PCT
Stony Brook	14	–	2	.875	22	–	10	.688
Vermont †	13	–	3	.813	24	–	12	.667
Boston University	12	–	4	.750	16	–	16	.500
Albany	9	–	7	.563	19	–	15	.559
Hartford	7	–	9	.438	9	–	22	.290
New Hampshire	7	–	9	.438	13	–	16	.448
Maine	6	–	10	.375	12	–	17	.414
UMBC	3	–	13	.188	4	–	26	.133
Binghamton	1	–	15	.063	2	–	29	.065
† 2012 America East tournament winner As of March 16, 2012; Rankings from AP Poll

The 2012 America East men's basketball tournament was held from March 1–4 at Chase Arena at Reich Family Pavilion in West Hartford, Connecticut, with the final held March 10 between the Stony Brook and the Vermont. As per America East tournament regulations, the final took place at Stony Brook University Arena, on the campus of Stony Brook University, the top and highest remaining seed. The Catamounts prevailed, 52-43, and earned an automatic bid to the 2012 NCAA tournament. All games except the play-in game was televised by the ESPN family of networks, including the Championship game on ESPN2.

== Bracket and Results ==
First round Thursday, March 1, 2012
8	UMBC	67^{OT}
9	Binghamton	73

Quarterfinals; Saturday, March 3, 2012; ESPN3
1	Stony Brook	78
9	Binghamton	69
4	Albany	63
5	New Hampshire	45
2	Vermont	50
7	Maine	40
3	Boston University	49
6	Hartford	53

Semifinals; Sunday, March 4, 2012; ESPN3
1	Stony Brook	57
4	Albany	55
2	Vermont	77
6	Hartford	73^{2OT}

Championship Game; Saturday, March 10, 2012; ESPN2
1	Stony Brook	43
2	Vermont	51

Championship game hosted by Stony Brook

== See also ==
- America East Conference
