= Tommy Brenton =

American basketball player (born 1989)

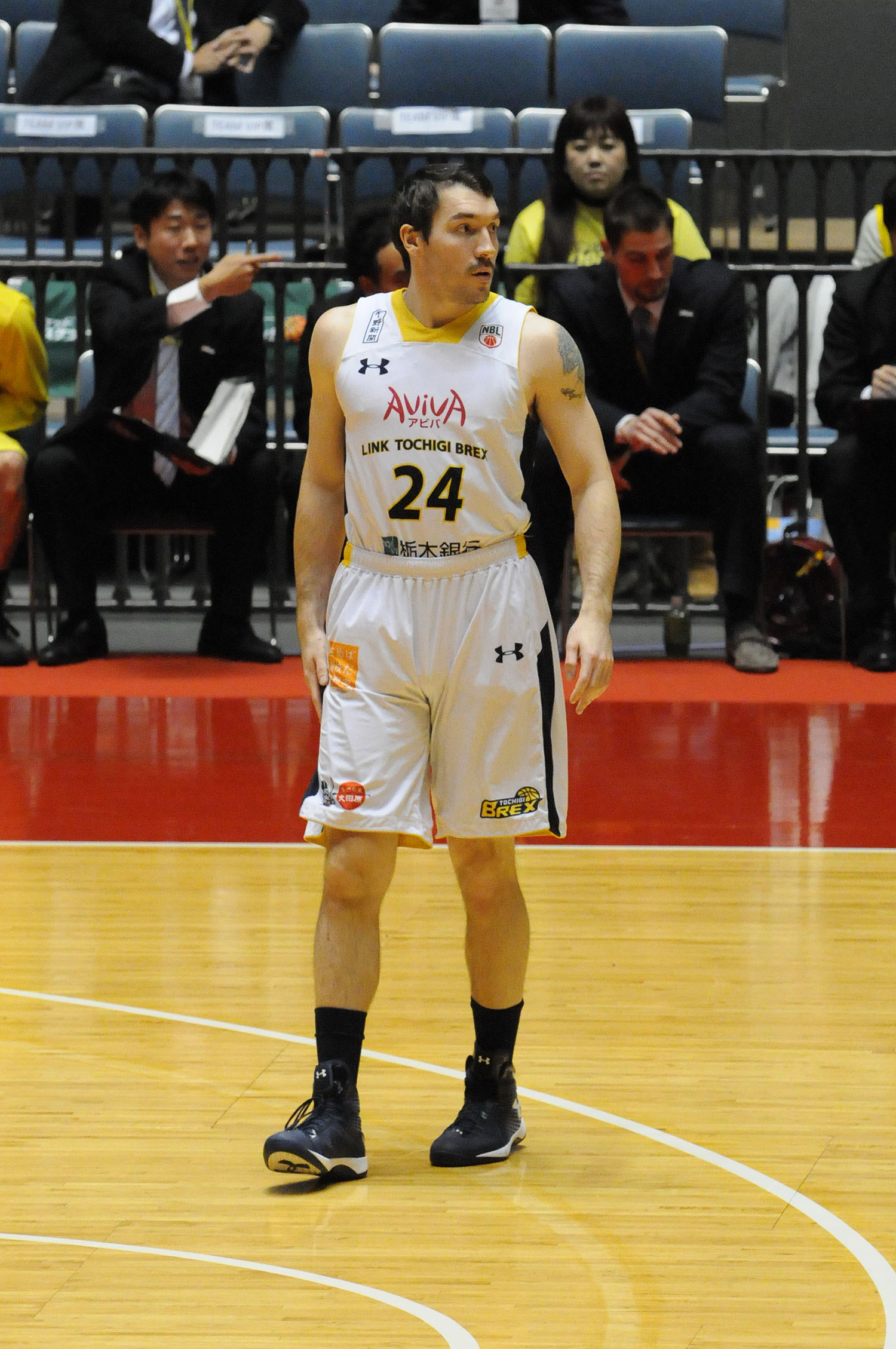

Personal information
- Born: May 2, 1989 (age 37)
- Listed height: 6 ft 5 in (1.96 m)
- Listed weight: 225 lb (102 kg)

Career information
- High school: River Hill (Clarksville, Maryland); Hargrave Military Academy (Chatham, Virginia)
- College: Stony Brook (2008–2013)
- NBA draft: 2013: undrafted
- Playing career: 2013–2017
- Position: Power forward
- Number: 24

Career history
- 2013–2017: Link Tochigi Brex

Career highlights
- Lefty Driesell Award winner (2013); AP honorable mention All-American (2013); America East Player of the Year (2013); 2× America East Defensive Player of the Year (2012, 2013); 2× First-team All-America East (2012, 2013); Second-team All-America East (2010)

Thomas Brenton (born May 2, 1989) is an American former professional basketball player. He played college basketball for the Stony Brook Seawolves of the America East Conference, where he won the 2013 Lefty Driesell Award, given to the top defensive player in Division I college basketball. Brenton also won the 2013 America East Conference Player of the Year, becoming the second player from Stony Brook to earn the award. He played professionally in Japan for the Link Tochigi Brex of the B.League from 2013 to 2017.

At 6'5" tall and playing the power forward position, Brenton is Stony Brook's all-time leader in assists and steals. He was inducted into the Stony Brook Hall of Fame in 2020.

== Early life ==
Brenton is a native of Columbia, Maryland. He attended River Hill High School in Clarksville, Maryland before going to Hargrave Military Academy in Chatham, Virginia for one postgraduate prep year. In Brenton's senior year at River Hill, he averaged 20.9 points and 10.3 rebounds per game while leading them to the Class AAA state championship. He was named the Howard County Player of the Year. In his lone season at Hargrave, the school went 29–0 and won the Prep School National Championship Tournament as a top-five ranked team in the country.

Brenton was only 5 foot 9 inches tall as a freshman but grew seven inches before graduating high school. He received several Division I offers and narrowed his final choices down to Stony Brook, UMBC and Western Carolina.

== College career ==
As a freshman, Brenton led Stony Brook and the America East conference with 8.9 rebounds per game. His 266 total rebounds were over twice as much as second place on the team.

Brenton was named second-team All-America East as a sophomore in 2010, averaging 7.6 points, 9.7 rebounds, 2.6 assists and 1.8 steals per game. He led the America East in rebounding for a second straight season. At the time, his 9.7 rebounds per game and 311 total rebounds were program records for Stony Brook. Brenton's 59 steals that season remain the Seawolves single-season program record. He was the Seawolves' leading rebounder, assister and stealer. Brenton helped Stony Brook win its first regular-season conference title with a 22–10 (13–2) record. In the NIT opening round against Illinois, Brenton had six rebounds.

Brenton dislocated his right kneecap and tore multiple ligaments in a pickup game in July before the 2010–11 season. Originally slated for a six-month absence that targeted his return for the start of conference play in January, Brenton required multiple surgeries and missed the entire season. Stony Brook finished 15–17 in fifth place, but still advanced to the America East championship game before losing.

He returned for the 2011–12 season, averaging 7.8 points, 8.1 rebounds, 3.4 assists and 1.7 steals per game. He led Stony Brook in rebounds, assists and steals, and won America East Defensive Player of the Year while being named first-team All-America East. Stony Brook won its second America East regular season title, and a 14–2 conference record was the best yet in program history.

In his final season, Brenton won America East Player of the Year and repeated as America East Defensive Player of the Year and first-team All-America East selection. He averaged 8.4 points, 8.5 rebounds, 4.8 assists and 1.6 steals per game. He became the second Stony Brook player to earn AP honorable mention All-America honors. He led the team in rebounds (279), assists (158), steals (54), and free throws made (100). His 158 total assists are still tied for the single-season program record. The Seawolves won their third America East regular season title, all during Brenton's tenure.

Brenton recorded Stony Brook's first triple-double in program history on January 26, 2013, with 15 points, 14 rebounds and 11 assists against Maine. He recorded a then-single-game program record 20 rebounds against Maine on February 24. He was one of the final 25 finalists for the Lou Henson Award, given to the top mid-major player in college basketball. He won the Lefty Driesell Award, given to the national defensive player of the year. He had six points, six rebounds, seven assists and four steals in the NIT opening round against UMass as Stony Brook earned its first-ever NIT win.

Brenton ended his collegiate career as Stony Brook's all-time leader in rebounds, assists and steals. He still holds the single-season program record for assists and steals. Stony Brook went 85–42 when Brenton was on the court and won its first three regular-season conference titles.

In 2020, Brenton was inducted into the Stony Brook Hall of Fame.

== Professional career ==
Brenton was not selected in the 2013 NBA draft. In July 2013, he signed with Link Tochigi Brex in the Japan Basketball League.
