= 2011–12 Vermont Catamounts men's basketball team =

American college basketball season

2011–12 Vermont Catamounts men's basketball

America East tournament champions

NCAA tournament, Round of 64
- Conference: America East Conference
- Record: 24–12 (13–3 America East)
- Head coach: John Becker (1st season)
- Assistant coaches: Chris Markwood; Matt O'Brien; Kyle Cieplicki
- Home arena: Patrick Gym

2011–12 America East men's basketball standings
	Conf.				Overall
Team	W		L	PCT	W		L	PCT
Stony Brook	14	–	2	.875	22	–	10	.688
Vermont †	13	–	3	.813	24	–	12	.667
Boston University	12	–	4	.750	16	–	16	.500
Albany	9	–	7	.563	19	–	15	.559
Hartford	7	–	9	.438	9	–	22	.290
New Hampshire	7	–	9	.438	13	–	16	.448
Maine	6	–	10	.375	12	–	17	.414
UMBC	3	–	13	.188	4	–	26	.133
Binghamton	1	–	15	.063	2	–	29	.065
† 2012 America East tournament winner As of March 16, 2012; Rankings from AP Poll

The 2011–12 Vermont Catamounts men's basketball team represented the University of Vermont during the 2011–12 NCAA Division I men's basketball season. The Catamounts, led by first year head coach John Becker, played their home games at Patrick Gym and are members of the America East Conference. They finished the season 24–12, 13–3 in America East play to finish in second place. They were champions of the America East Basketball tournament and earned the conference's automatic bid into the 2012 NCAA tournament. They defeated Lamar in the First Four round before falling to North Carolina in the second round.

== Roster ==
Number	Name	Position	Height	Weight	Year	Hometown
2	Luke Apfeld	Forward	6–7	215	Sophomore	Chattanooga, Tennessee
4	Four McGlynn	Guard	6–2	180	Freshman	York, Pennsylvania
12	Sandro Carissimo	Guard	6–2	170	Sophomore	Sleepy Hollow, New York
14	Josh Elbaum	Guard	6–3	195	Sophomore	Melville, New York
20	Brendan Bald	Guard	6–5	200	Junior	Millersville, Maryland
21	Candon Rusin	Guard	6–4	190	Junior	Wilmington, Vermont
23	Brian Voelkel	Forward	6–6	210	Sophomore	Pleasantville, New York
24	Chris Santo	Forward	6–5	210	Freshman	Cherry Hill, New Jersey
30	Pat Bergmann (W)	Forward/Center	6–9	240	Senior	Burlington, Vermont
31	Clancy Rugg (W)	Forward	6–8	195	Sophomore	Burlington, Vermont
34	Matt Glass	Forward	6–8	210	RS Senior	Underhill, Vermont
40	Ryan McKeaney	Forward	6–9	210	Sophomore	Marlton, New Jersey
42	Ben Crenca	Forward/Center	6–10	260	Junior	Exeter, Rhode Island

== Schedule ==
Date time, TV	Rank^{#}	Opponent^{#}	Result	Record	Site (attendance) city, state
Exhibition
October 29, 2011*; 4:00 pm		Saint Michael's	W 64–31	—	Patrick Gym (2,107); Burlington, VT
November 5, 2011*; 1:00 pm		Concordia (QC)	W 69–56	—	Patrick Gym (1,986); Burlington, VT
Regular season
November 12, 2011*; 7:00 pm		at South Florida; Hall of Fame Tip-Off Tournament	L 59–61	0–1	Bob Martinez Sports Center (2,319); Tampa, FL
November 16, 2011*; 7:00 pm		Dartmouth; Hall of Fame Tip-Off Tournament	W 65–53	1–1	Leede Arena (1,319); Hanover, NH
November 19, 2011*; 6:00 pm		vs. Marist; Hall of Fame Tip-Off Tournament	W 84–75	2–1	Mohegan Sun Arena (1,504); Uncasville, CT
November 20, 2011*; 5:30 pm		vs. Long Island; Hall of Fame Tip-Off Tournament	L 75–80	2–2	Mohegan Sun Arena (1,223); Uncasville, CT
November 23, 2011*; 7:00 pm, CSNMA		at Old Dominion	W 65–63 ^{OT}	3–2	Ted Constant Convocation Center (6,902); Norfolk, VA
November 26, 2011*; 1:00 pm, WCAXtra		Siena	W 64–62	3–3	Patrick Gym (2,562); Burlington, VT
December 1, 2011*; 7:00 pm		Harvard	L 48–55	4–3	Patrick Gym (2,827); Burlington, VT
December 3, 2011*; 2:00 pm		at Yale	L 52–68	4–4	Payne Whitney Gymnasium (1,205); New Haven, CT
December 7, 2011*; 8:00 pm, FS Midwest		at Saint Louis	L 43–62	4–5	Chaifetz Arena (5,677); St. Louis, MO
December 11, 2011*; 1:00 pm		Quinnipiac	L 58–62	4–6	Patrick Gym (2,251); Burlington, VT
December 17, 2011*; 1:00 pm		Iona	L 72–73	4–7	Patrick Gym (2,245); Burlington, VT
December 21, 2011*; 7:00 pm		at Fairleigh Dickinson	W 71–53	5–7	Rothman Center (1,050); Hackensack, NJ
December 23, 2011*; 7:00 pm		at Towson	W 65–49	6–7	Towson Center (942); Towson, MD
December 30, 2011*; 4:30 pm		Northeastern	L 51–53	6–8	Patrick Gym (2,340); Burlington, VT
January 2, 2012; 7:00 pm		at Stony Brook	L 59–65	6–9 (0–1)	Pritchard Gymnasium (1,088); Stony Brook, NY
January 5, 2012; 7:00 pm, WCAXtra		Boston University	W 83–69	7–9 (1–1)	Patrick Gym (2,049); Burlington, VT
January 8, 2012; 2:00 pm		at Hartford	W 72–59	8–9 (2–1)	Chase Arena at RFP (873); Hartford, CT
January 12, 2012; 7:00 pm		Binghamton	W 73–53	9–9 (3–1)	Patrick Gym (1,931); Burlington, VT
January 14, 2012; 3:00 pm		at New Hampshire	L 64–72	9–10 (3–2)	Lundholm Gym (1,021); Durham, NH
January 16, 2012; 7:00 pm, WCAXtra		Maine	W 79–65	10–10 (4–2)	Patrick Gym (2,142); Burlington, VT
January 19, 2012; 7:00 pm, ESPN3		Albany	W 73–69	11–10 (5–2)	Patrick Gym (2,260); Burlington, VT
January 22, 2012; 1:00 pm		at UMBC	W 90–62	12–10 (6–2)	Retriever Activities Center (838); Baltimore, MD
January 29, 2012; 12:00 pm, CBSSN		New Hampshire	W 77–60	13–10 (7–2)	Patrick Gym (2,774); Burlington, VT
February 1, 2012; 7:00 pm, ESPN3		at Boston University	W 68–67	14–10 (8–2)	Case Gym (1,163); Boston, MA
February 4, 2012; 1:00 pm, WCAXtra		Hartford	W 82–56	15–10 (9–2)	Patrick Gym (2,412); Burlington, VT
February 6, 2012; 7:00 pm		at Maine	W 73–63	16–10 (10–2)	Memorial Gymnasium (1,137); Orono, ME
February 12, 2012; 12:00 pm, CBSSN		Stony Brook	W 68–49	17–10 (11–2)	Patrick Gym (3,266); Burlington, VT
February 15, 2012; 7:00 pm, TWCS		at Albany	W 50–47	18–10 (12–2)	SEFCU Arena (2,811); Albany, NY
February 18, 2012*; 2:00 pm		Niagara; ESPN BracketBusters	W 92–70	19–10	Patrick Gym (2,895); Burlington, VT
February 21, 2012; 7:00 pm		at Binghamton	L 53–57	19–11 (12–3)	Binghamton University Events Center (2,427); Vestal, NY
February 25, 2012; 1:00 pm, WCAXtra		UMBC	W 80–49	20–11 (13–3)	Patrick Gym (2,817); Burlington, VT
America East tournament
March 3, 2012; 6:00 pm, ESPN3	(2)	vs. (7) Maine; Quarterfinals	W 50–40	21–11	Chase Arena at RFP (2,562); Hartford, CT
March 4, 2012; 7:15 pm, ESPN3	(2)	vs. (6) Hartford; Semifinals	W 77–73 ^{2OT}	22–11	Chase Arena at RFP (2,644); Hartford, CT
March 10, 2012; 11:00 am, ESPN2	(2)	at (1) Stony Brook; Championship Game	W 51–43	23–11	Stony Brook University Arena (4,423); Stony Brook, NY
NCAA tournament
March 14, 2012*; 6:30 pm, truTV	(16MW)	vs. (16MW) Lamar; First Four	W 71–59	24–11	University of Dayton Arena (7,218); Dayton, OH
March 16, 2012*; 4:10 pm, TBS	(16MW)	vs. (1MW) No. 4 North Carolina; Second Round	L 58–77	24–12	Greensboro Coliseum (16,422); Greensboro, NC
*Non-conference game. ^{#}Rankings from AP Poll. (#) Tournament seedings in parentheses. All times are in Eastern Time.
