= List of 2020s American state and local politicians convicted of crimes =

This list includes American politicians at the state and local levels who have been convicted of felony crimes committed while in office by decade; this list encompasses the 2020s.

At the bottom of the article are links to related articles which deal with politicians who are involved in federal scandals (political and sexual), as well as differentiating among federal, state and local convictions.

Excluded are crimes which occur outside the politician's tenure in office unless they specifically stem from acts during their time of service.

Entries are arranged by date, from most current to less recent, and by state.

== Alabama ==
- State Representative Kelvin Lawrence (D) convicted of forgery. (2024)
- State Representative John Rogers (D) convicted of wire and mail fraud. (2024)
- State Representative David Cole (R) convicted of voter fraud. (2023)
- State Representative Fred Plump (D) convicted of fraud. (2023)
- State Representative Will Dismukes (R) convicted of theft. (2023)
- State Senator David Burkette (D) convicted of campaign violations. (2020)

== Arizona ==
- State Senator Tony Navarrete (D) convicted of sexual relations with a minor. (2024)
- State Senator Keith Bee (R) convicted of fraud. (2022)
- State Representative Austin Smith (R) convicted of forging signatures on nominating petitions and barred from public office. (2024)

=== Local ===
- Assessor of Maricopa County Paul Peterson (R) convicted of illegally transporting pregnant women from the Marshall Islands so their babies could be adopted. (2020)

== Arkansas ==
- State Representative Eddie Cooper (politician) (D) convicted of conspiracy. (2024)
- State Representative Marsh Davis (R) convicted of failing to pay child support. (2024)
- State Representative Denny Altes (R) convicted of abuse of public trust. (2023)
- State Senator Jeremy Hutchinson (R) convicted of bribery, tax fraud, wire fraud, and conspiracy. (2022)

=== Local ===
- John Jessup (R) Hancock County Commissioner from Shirley, pled guilty to a charge of sexual assault on his own daughter and was sentenced to 6 to 15 years. (2024)

== California ==
=== Local ===
- Arcadia Mayor Eileen Wang (D) pleads guilty to acting as a foreign agent for the People's Republic of China. (2026)
- San Jose City Councilor Omar Torres (D) convicted of child molestation. (2025)
- Orange County Supervisor Andrew Do (R) convicted of bribery. (2025)
- Los Angeles Deputy Mayor Brian Williams (D) pleaded guilty to making a bomb threat towards city hall. (2025)
- Mayor of Anaheim Harry Sidhu (R) agreed to plead guilty to obstruction of justice, wire fraud and making false statements. (2023)
- Los Angeles Councilman Curren Price (D) convicted embezzlement and perjury. (2023)
- Los Angeles Councilman Mark Ridley-Thomas (D) convicted of bribery and fraud. (2023)
- Los Angeles Councilman José Huizar (D) pleaded guilty to violating the RICO Act and tax evasion. (2023)
- Los Angeles Councilman Mitchell Englander (R) convicted of obstruction in relation to a probe into alleged corruption. (2021)

== Colorado ==
- State Senator Sonya Jaquez Lewis (D) convicted of forgery. (2026)
- State Representative Tracey Bernett (D) convicted of perjury about her residency and received a two-year deferred judgement plus community service. (2023)

=== Local ===
- County Clerk of Mesa County Tina Peters (R) was convicted for efforts to overturn the 2020 election. She was found guilty of 4 felony counts of election tampering and sentenced to nine years in prison. Her sentence was commuted to half by Colorado governor Jared Polis in 2026. (2021)

== Connecticut ==
- State Senator Dennis Bradley (D) was convicted of wire fraud. (2026)
- State Representative Chris Ziogas (D) convicted of extortion. (2025)
- State Representative Michael DiMassa (D) pleaded guilty to conspiracy for stealing COVID relief funds. (2022)

=== Local ===
- Hartford City Council Member Alexander Thomas (Working Families) pleaded guilty to money laundering and larceny from a church. (2026)
- Norwalk Registrar of Voters Ellen Wink (R) was convicted of killing a tenant at a home she owned in 2022. (2025)

== Delaware ==
- Auditor of Delaware Kathy McGuiness (D) accused of nepotism she was convicted of misdemeanor conflict of interest. (2022)
- State Representative Kevin Hensley (R) pled guilty to vehicular assault and DUI for injuring another driver. (2025)

== Florida ==
- State Senator Frank Artiles (R) convicted of election conspiracy. (2024)
- State Representative Joe Harding (R) convicted of wire fraud, money laundering, and false statements involving COVID-19 relief funds. (2023)

=== Local ===
- Tax collector of Seminole County Joel Greenberg (R) was convicted of sex trafficking for former congressman Matt Gaetz (R-FL). (2022)

== Georgia ==
- State Representative Dexter Sharper (D) pled guilty to fraud. (2026)
- State Representative Karen Bennett (D) pled guilty to fraud. (2026)
- State Representative Danny Rampey (R) convicted of obtaining drugs by misrepresentation or theft, exploiting an elder or disabled adult, burglary, and drug possession. (2022)
- Insurance Commissioner of Georgia John Oxendine (R) convicted of money laundering and fraud. (2022)
- Insurance Commissioner of Georgia Jim Beck (R) convicted of fraud. (2021)
- Georgia Board of Regents member Dean Alford (R) convicted of racketeering. (2021)

=== Local ===
- Bleckley County Sheriff Kris Coody (R) pleaded guilty to sexual battery. (2023)
- Atlanta City Councilor Antonio Brown (D) convicted of fraud. (2023)

== Hawaii ==
- State Senator J. Kalani English (D) convicted of bribery. (2022)
- State Representative Ty Cullen (D) convicted of bribery. (2022)

== Idaho ==
- State Representative Aaron von Ehlinger (R) convicted of rape. (2022)
- State Representative John Green (R) convicted of fraud. (2020)

== Illinois ==
- State Senator Annazette Collins (D) convicted of tax offences. (2024)
- State Senator Sam McCann (R) convicted of wire fraud, money laundering and tax evasion, 42 months. (2024)
- State Representative Luis Arroyo (D) convicted of fraud. (2022)
- State Senator Tom Cullerton (D) convicted of embezzlement. (2022)
- State Representative Eddie Acevedo (D) convicted of tax evasion. (2021)
- State Senator Terry Link (D) was convicted of tax evasion. (2020)
- State Senator Martin Sandoval (D) convicted of bribery. (2020).
- State Representative Michael Madigan (D) was convicted of bribery and wire fraud and sentenced to 7.5 years in prison. (2023)

=== Local ===
- Alderman of Chicago City Council Edward M. Burke (D) convicted of racketeering, bribery and attempted extortion. (2024)
- Mayor of Oakbrook Terrace Tony Ragucci (D) pleaded guilty to taking $88,000 in a red light camera kickback scheme. (2022)
- Alderman of Chicago City Council Patrick Daley Thompson (D) convicted of fraud. (2022)
- Mayor of Crestwood, Louis Presta (R) resigned and pleaded guilty to taking a $5,000 cash bribe for favorable treatment of SafeSpeed, a red light camera company. (2021)
- Worth Township Supervisor John O’Sullivan (D) convicted of bribery. (2021)
- Alderman of Chicago City Council Ricardo Muñoz (D) convicted of fraud. (2021)
- Alderman of Chicago City Council Proco Joe Moreno (D) convicted of filing a false report. (2021)
- Cook County Commissioner and mayor of McCook Jeff Tobolski (D) convicted of extortion conspiracy. (2020)

== Indiana ==
- State Representative Sean Eberhart (R) pled guilty to felony charges of corruption for accepting a $350,000 a year job, in exchange for his legislative support for new gambling casinos. (2023)
- State Senator Brent Waltz (R) convicted of illegal campaign contributions and making false statements to the FBI. (2022)

=== Local ===
- Former Madison County Councilman Steve Sumner (R) pleaded guilty to possession of child pornography, rape, and child molesting during his time in office. He had been on the run from 2023 until the United States Marshals Service arrested him in 2025. (2026)
- Sheriff of Clark County Jamey Noel (R) pled guilty to 27 felonies of theft and tax evasion to fund a lavish lifestyle. (2024)
- John Jessup (R) Hancock County Commissioner, pled guilty to a charge of sexual assault on his own daughter and was sentenced to 6 to 15 years. (2024)
- Mayor of Muncie Dennis Tyler (D) convicted of theft of government. (2021)

== Kansas ==
- State Representative Michael Capps (R) convicted of fraud. (2022)

== Kentucky ==
- State Representative Robert Goforth (R) was convicted of fraud of 2.7 million dollars. (2022)

=== Local ===
- Alexandria Councilman Shane Collins entered an Alford plea to criminal mischief for assaulting his wife. (2025)
- Mayor of Plum Springs Shedrick Johnson (D) pled guilty to devising a wire fraud scheme in which he withdrew $38,168.96 for his personal benefit. (2022)

== Louisiana ==
- State Senator Karen Carter Peterson (D) pleaded guilty to gambling with campaign funds. (2022)
- State Senator Wesley T. Bishop (D) pleaded guilty to making false statements. (2020)
- Secretary Jack Montoucet (D) of the Louisiana Department of Wildlife and Fisheries (“LDWF”) was sentenced to 27 months for conspiring to defraud the US by soliciting and accepting kickbacks in return for state contracts.

== Maine ==
- State Representative Clinton Collamore (D) convicted of elections violations. (2023)

== Maryland ==
- State Delegate Richard Impallaria (R) pleaded guilty to multiple counts of theft, misconduct in office, and illegal ammunition and gun possession. (2023)
- State Secretary of Information Technology Isabel Fitzgerald (D) convicted of bribery. (2022)
- State Delegate Cheryl Glenn (D) pleaded guilty to accepting $33,000 in bribes. (2020).
- State Delegate Tawanna P. Gaines (D) pleaded guilty to misuse of campaign funds (2020)

=== Local ===
- Harford County Councilman Dion F. Guthrie (D) entered an Alford plea to felony theft.
- Baltimore State's Attorney Marilyn Mosby (D) was found guilty of perjury. (2023)
- Mayor of Baltimore Catherine Pugh (D) convicted of fraud and perjury. (2020)

== Massachusetts ==
- State Representative Chris Flanagan (D) convicted of wire fraud. (2025)
- State Senator Dean Tran (R) convicted of fraud. (2024)
- State Representative David Nangle (D) convicted of wire fraud. (2020)

=== Local ===
- Boston City Councilor Tania Fernandes Anderson (D) convicted of theft and wire fraud. (2025)
- Boston City Councilor Kendra Lara (D) convicted of dangerous driving. (2023)
- Fall River Mayor Jasiel Correia (D) convicted of wire fraud, extortion conspiracy, and extortion. (2021)

== Michigan ==
- State Representative Jewell Jones (D) convicted of driving under the influence of alcohol. (2022)
- State Representative Bryan Posthumus (R) was sentenced to 15 days in jail for "operating while intoxicated". (2021)
- Rick Johnson (Michigan politician) Chairman of the Michigan Medical Marijuana Board, received over $100,000 in bribes. (2019)

=== Local ===
- Saginaw City Councilwoman Monique Lamar-Silvia was convicted of forging signatures on a nominating petition to get Eric Eggleston on the city council election ballot. (2025)
- Mayor of Romulus LeRoy Burcroff (R) sentenced for theft and misuse of over $15,000 in campaign funds. (2024)
- Mayor of Taylor, Richard Sollars (R) pleads guilty to felony bribery and wire fraud for accepting $93K and was given 71 months. (2023)
- Flint Township Clerk Kathy Funk (D) convicted of misconduct (ballot tampering). (2023)
- Detroit City Councillor Andre Spivey (I) convicted of bribery. (2022)
- Detroit City Councillor Gabe Leland (D) convicted of misconduct. (2021)

== Minnesota ==
- Justin Eichorn (R) State Senator from District 5, pleaded guilty to felony attempted possession of child sexual abuse material. (2026)
- State Senator Nichole Mitchell (D) convicted of burglary. (2025)
- State Representative Jason Metsa (D) convicted of sexual misconduct. (2024)

== Mississippi ==
- State Senator Philip Moran (R) convicted of bribery and conspiracy and sentenced to 20 years. (2026)
- State Representative Earle S. Banks (D) convicted of fraud. (2023)
- John Davis (R) Director of the Mississippi Department of Human Services pleaded guilty to felony conspiracy and fraud. Given 32 years. (2022)

=== Local ===
- Former Jackson Mayor Chokwe Antar Lumumba (D) and former Jackson City Council President Aaron Banks (D) pleaded guilty to conspiracy as part of a bribery scheme. (2026)
- Hinds County District Attorney Jody Owens (D) pleads guilty to bribery. Sherik Marve Smith, a businessman and relative of Owens, previously pleaded guilty in the same case. (2026)
- Diamondhead City Councilman Alan Moran (R) and son of Philip Moran was already serving a 12 year conviction for child exploitation, and was sentenced to another 10 years for bribery and conspiracy. (2026)
- Jackson Councilwoman Angelique Lee (D) pleaded guilty to bribery. (2024)

== Missouri ==
- State Representative John Diehl (R) and SOTH, from the 89th District, pled guilty to wire fraud for using $379,000 in pandemic relief funds for personal use. (2024)
- State Representative Tricia Derges (R) convicted of fraud. (2022).
- State Representative Courtney Allen Curtis (D) convicted of fraud. (2020)

=== Local ===
- Mayor of Willard Corey Hendrickson (R) pled guilty to Wire Fraud and Identity Theft and was sentenced to 3 yrs in prison and ordered to pay $318,000 in restitution. (2024)
- Alderman of St. Louis Brandon Bosley (D) convicted of fraud. (2023)
- President of the St. Louis Board of Aldermen Lewis E. Reed (D) convicted of bribery. (2022)
- Alderman of St Louis Jeffrey Boyd (D) convicted of bribery. (2022)
- Alderman of St. Louis John Collins-Muhammad (D) convicted of bribery. (2022)

== Nevada ==
- State Assemblyman Alexander Assefa (D) convicted of theft. (2023)

=== Local ===
- Las Vegas City Councillor Michele Fiore (R) convicted of seven counts of wire fraud and conspiracy, and Pardoned by Donald Trump. (2024)
- Clark County Public Administrator Robert Telles (D) convicted of murder. (2024)

== New Hampshire ==
- Supreme Court Justice Anna Hantz Marconi (R) pled no contest to criminal solicitation in regards to interfering with charges against her husband Geno Marconi for illegal release of confidential records. (2024)
- State Representative Troy Merner (R) convicted of wrongful voting and theft by deception. (2024)
- State Representative Stacie-Marie Laughton (D) convicted of child exploitation. (2024)
- State Representative Robert Forsythe (R) pleaded guilty to two counts of assault. (2021)
- State Representative Bryan Morse (politician) (R) from the 3rd District was convicted on two felony counts of posting nude sexual images on line without her consent. (2026)

== New Jersey ==
- State Assemblyman Carmelo Garcia (D) convicted of bribery. (2024)

=== Local ===
- Willinboro Councilman and former mayor Nathaniel "Nat" Anderson (D) was convicted of bank fraud. (2026)
- Clark Mayor Sal Bonaccorso (R) pleaded guilty to conspiracy to commit official misconduct and forgery. (2024)

== New Mexico ==
- State Representative Sheryl Williams Stapleton (D) convicted of fraud. (2026)

=== Local ===
- Otero County Commissioner Couy Griffin (R) was convicted of illegally entering restricted grounds and planning, mobilization and incitement. (2021)

== New York ==
- State Assemblyman Luis Diaz (D) convicted of fraud. (2022)

=== Local ===
- Highway Superintendent of Chester John Reilly III (R) convicted of assault and firearms charges for shooting at lost DoorDash driver. (2026)
- County Executive of Orange County Edward A. Diana (R) convicted of corruption. (2021)
- New York City Councilor Chaim Deutsch (D) convicted of fraud. (2021)

== North Carolina ==
- Auditor of North Carolina Beth Wood (D) pleaded guilty misusing a state vehicle in a hit and run. (2023)
- State Representative Derwin Montgomery (D) convicted of fraud. (2023)
- State Representative David R. Lewis (R) convicted of making false statements to a bank. (2020)

== North Dakota ==
- State Senator Ray Holmberg (R) convicted of sex with minors. (2024)
- State Representative Jason Dockter (R) convicted of using public office for personal gain. (2024)

== Ohio ==
- State Representative Bob Young (R) convicted of domestic violence. (2024)
- Speaker of the Ohio House of Representatives Larry Householder (R) convicted of racketeering. (2023)
- Chairman of the Ohio Republican Party Matt Borges (R) convicted of racketeering. (2023)

=== Local ===
- Mayor of East Cleveland Brandon King (D) convicted of 10 corruption-related charges. (2025)
- Cleveland City Councilor Kenneth Johnson (D) convicted of tax violations and federal conspiracy to defraud the government. (2021)
- Mayor of Holloway Joseph Schaeffer (R) convicted of felony aggravated menacing for threatening to blow up a local courthouse. (2025)
- Cincinnati City Councilor Basheer Jones (D) convicted of corruption. (2024)
- Cincinnati City Councilor Jeffrey Pastor (R) convicted of fraud. (2023) * Cincinnati City Councilor Jeffrey Pastor (R) convicted of fraud. (2023)
- Cincinnati City Councilor P.G. Sittenfeld (D) convicted of corruption. (2022)
- Cincinnati City Council President Tamaya Dennard (D) convicted of fraud. (2020)
- Chairman of the Ohio Republican Party Matt Borges (R) convicted of racketeering. (2023)
- Toledo City Councilor Gary Johnson (D) convicted of extortion. (2023)
- Toledo City Councilor Larry Sykes (D) convicted of bribery. (2022)
- Toledo City Councilor Yvonne Harper (D) convicted of bribery. (2022)
- Toledo City Councilor Tyrone Riley (D) convicted of bribery. (2022)

== Oklahoma ==
- State Representative Ajay Pittman (D) pled guilty to forgery. (2026)
- State Representative Ty Burns (R) pled guilty to three charges of attempting to gouge his wife's eye out, and forcing a vehicle off the road which contained his daughter. (2025)
- State Representative Ryan Martinez (R) pleaded guilty to a felony charge of Driving under the influence. (2023)
- State Representative Dan Kirby (R) was found guilty of involuntary manslaughter. (2023)

== Oregon ==
- State Representative Mike Nearman (R) convicted of official misconduct for allowing rioters to enter the Oregon State Capitol. (2021)

== Pennsylvania ==
- State Senator Mike Folmer (R) was convicted of possession of child pornography and served one year in prison. (2020)

== Puerto Rico ==
- State Senator Abel Nazario (PNP) convicted of bribery. (2023)
- Secretary of Education of Puerto Rico Julia Keleher convicted of corruption. (2021)

=== Local ===
- Mayor of Guayama Angel Pérez Otero (PNP) was convicted of corruption. (2023)
- Mayor of Trujillo Alto José Luis Cruz Cruz (PPD) convicted of bribery. (2023)
- Mayor of Guayama Eduardo Cintrón (PPD) pleaded guilty to corruption for his part in a bribery scheme. (2022)

== South Carolina ==
- State Representative Rick Martin (R) convicted of misconduct in public office. (2025)
- State Representative RJ May (R) was convicted of felony possession and distribution of child sexual abuse material. (2025)

== South Dakota ==
- Attorney General of South Dakota Jason Ravnsborg (R) convicted of causing death by dangerous driving. (2022)

== Tennessee ==
- Speaker of the Tennessee House of Representatives Glen Casada (R) pled guilty to bribery. (2024) In 2025 he was pardoned by Donald Trump.
- State Senator Brian Kelsey (R) guilty of fraud and campaign violations. Sentenced to 21 months. Pardoned by Donald Trump. (2022)
- State Representative Robin Smith (R) pleaded guilty to fraud. (2022)
- State Senator Katrina Robinson (D) convicted of fraud. (2021)

== Texas ==
- State Representative Ronald Wilson (R) convicted of tax evasion. (2022)
- State Judge Manuel Barraza (R) took bribes and was convicted of fraud. (2008)

=== Local ===
- Fort Bend County Judge KP George (R) was found guilty of felony money laundering. (2026)
- Mayor of Kendleton Darryl Humphrey pleaded guilty to refusing to provide access to public information with regards to an RV park owner's FOIA requests. (2025)
- Mayor of Richardson, Laura Maczka (R) was convicted of bribery and wire fraud. (2021)
- Hays County Precinct Chair and Sergeant-at-Arms Bo Michael Dresner (R) pled guilty to four counts of felony child abuse and child pornography, and was sentenced to 410 years in prison. (2024)

== Virginia ==
- State Delegate Matt Fariss (R/I) pleaded guilty to felony gun and drug charges. (2024)

=== Local ===
- Culpeper County Sheriff Scott Jenkins (R) convicted of bribery (2023)

== West Virginia ==
- State Senator Mike Maroney (R) convicted of indecent exposure. (2025)
- State Delegate Derrick Evans (R) pled quilty to a felony charge of civil disobedience for participating in the 2021 United States Capitol attack. He was later pardoned by Donald Trump. (2022)
- State Delegate David Pritt (R) resigned and pled guilty to one felony count of attempted production of child pornography. (2026)

=== Local ===
- Mayor of Buckhannon David Walter McCauley (R) pleaded guilty to a felony charge of possessing child pornography. (2022)

== Wisconsin ==
- State Senator Kevin Shibilski (D) convicted of fraud. (2022)

=== Local ===
Election Judge Kimberly Zapata (R) thought she was acting as a ‘whistleblower’ when she requested and mailed three fake absentee ballots. She was arrested, charged with felony misconduct and sentenced to nine months in jail but given probation.(2022)

== See also ==
- List of federal political scandals in the United States
- List of American federal politicians convicted of crimes
- List of United States representatives expelled, censured, or reprimanded
- List of United States senators expelled or censured
- List of federal political sex scandals in the United States
- List of 2010s American state and local politicians convicted of crimes
