= New Hampshire Wildcats men's basketball statistical leaders =

The New Hampshire Wildcats men's basketball statistical leaders are individual statistical leaders of the New Hampshire Wildcats men's basketball program in various categories, including points, assists, blocks, rebounds, and steals. Within those areas, the lists identify single-game, single-season, and career leaders. The Wildcats represent the University of New Hampshire in the NCAA's America East Conference.

New Hampshire began competing in intercollegiate basketball in 1902. However, the school's record book does not generally list records from before the 1950s, as records from before this period are often incomplete and inconsistent. Since scoring was much lower in this era, and teams played much fewer games during a typical season, it is likely that few or no players from this era would appear on these lists anyway.

The NCAA did not officially record assists as a stat until the 1983–84 season, and blocks and steals until the 1985–86 season, but New Hampshire's record books includes players in these stats before these seasons. These lists are updated through the end of the 2021–22 season.

== Scoring ==
Career
Rk	Player	Points	Seasons
1	Tanner Leissner	1,962	2014–15 2015–16 2016–17 2017–18
2	Al McClain	1,861	1980–81 1981–82 1982–83 1983–84
3	Robin Dixon	1,590	1979–80 1980–81 1981–82 1982–83
4	Alvin Abreu	1,564	2007–08 2008–09 2009–10 2010–11 2011–12
5	Wayne Morrison	1,501	1972–73 1973–74 1974–75 1975–76
6	Jaleen Smith	1,397	2013–14 2014–15 2015–16 2016–17
7	Blagoj Janev	1,340	2003–04 2004–05 2005–06 2006–07
8	Tyrece Gibbs	1,329	2005–06 2006–07 2007–08 2008–09
9	Tyrone Conley	1,304	2007–08 2008–09 2009–10 2010–11
10	Scott Drapeau	1,290	1993–94 1994–95

Season
Rk	Player	Points	Season
1	Scott Drapeau	648	1994–95
2	Scott Drapeau	642	1993–94
3	Al McClain	638	1983–84
4	Matt Alosa	624	1995–96
5	Matt Alosa	623	1994–95
6	Clarence O. Daniels II	602	2023–24
7	Tanner Leissner	581	2017–18
8	Tanner Leissner	547	2016–17
9	Robin Dixon	562	1982–83
10	Jaleen Smith	506	2016–17

Single game
Rk	Player	Points	Season	Opponent
1	Frank McLaughlin	44	1954–55	UMass

== Rebounds ==
Career
Rk	Player	Rebounds	Seasons
1	Iba Camara	1,016	2014–15 2015–16 2016–17 2017–18
2	Dave Pemberton	897	1969–70 1970–71 1971–72
3	Tanner Leissner	862	2014–15 2015–16 2016–17 2017–18
4	Dane DiLiegro	837	2007–08 2008–09 2009–10 2010–11
5	Dan Nolan	826	1980–81 1981–82 1982–83 1983–84
6	Dirk Koopman	726	1982–83 1983–84 1984–85 1985–86
7	Jim Rich	721	1960–61 1961–62 1962–63 1963–64
8	Eric Thielen	717	1987–88 1988–89 1989–90 1990–91
9	Matt Acres	680	1994–95 1995–96 1996–97 1997–98
10	Brian Benson	626	2008–09 2009–10 2010–11 2011–12

Season
Rk	Player	Rebounds	Season
1	Pete Smilikis	428	1959–60
2	Dave Pemberton	345	1971–72
3	Iba Camara	331	2017–18
4	Clarence O. Daniels II	320	2022–23
5	Dave Pemberton	303	1970–71
6	Clarence O. Daniels II	297	2023–24
7	Iba Camara	293	2016–17
8	Iba Camara	285	2015–16
9	Chris Brown	282	2001–02
10	Scott Drapeau	277	1993–94

Single game
Rk	Player	Rebounds	Season	Opponent
1	Pete Smilikis	27	1959–60	Middlebury

== Assists ==
Career
Rk	Player	Assists	Seasons
1	Wayne Morrison	505	1972–73 1973–74 1974–75 1975–76
2	Al McClain	415	1980–81 1981–82 1982–83 1983–84
3	Jaleen Smith	364	2013–14 2014–15 2015–16 2016–17
4	Keith Dickson	361	1975–76 1976–77 1977–78 1978–79
5	Erie Feragne	359	1971–72 1972–73 1973–74
6	Chandler Rhoads	307	2009–10 2010–11 2011–12 2012–13
7	Andy Johnston	286	1983–84 1984–85 1985–86 1986–87
8	Doug Wilson	283	1992–93 1993–94 1994–95 1995–96
9	Keith Carpenter	277	1986–87 1987–88 1988–89 1989–90
10	Robin Dixon	272	1979–80 1980–81 1981–82 1982–83

Season
Rk	Player	Assists	Season
1	Wayne Morrison	163	1972–73
2	Erie Feragne	162	1971–72
3	Ahmad Robinson	147	2023–24
4	Jaleen Smith	137	2016–17
5	Colin Donahue	135	2000–01
6	Keith Dickson	133	1978–79
7	Wayne Morrison	131	1973–74
8	Al McClain	123	1982–83
9	Russell Graham	121	2009–10
10	Al McClain	118	1983–84

Single game
Rk	Player	Assists	Season	Opponent
1	Randy Kinzly	19	1980–81	Colgate

== Steals ==
Career
Rk	Player	Steals	Seasons
1	Al McClain	306	1980–81 1981–82 1982–83 1983–84
2	Doug Wilson	193	1992–93 1993–94 1994–95 1995–96
3	Dan Nolan	145	1980–81 1981–82 1982–83 1983–84
4	Keith Carpenter	134	1986–87 1987–88 1988–89 1989–90
5	Jermaine Anderson	130	2003–04 2004–05 2005–06 2006–07
6	Chris Brown	128	1997–98 1998–99 1999–00 2000–01 2001–02
7	Bryant Davis	125	1989–90 1990–91 1991–92 1992–93
8	Robin Dixon	121	1979–80 1980–81 1981–82 1982–83
9	Ed Eusebio	117	1992–93 1993–94 1994–95 1995–96
10	Jaleen Smith	115	2013–14 2014–15 2015–16 2016–17

Season
Rk	Player	Steals	Season
1	Al McClain	82	1983–84
2	Al McClain	78	1980–81
3	Al McClain	77	1981–82
4	Al McClain	69	1982–83
5	Doug Wilson	63	1993–94
6	Doug Wilson	56	1994–95
7	Shejdie Childs	55	2003–04
8	Jermaine Anderson	52	2004–05
9	Doug Wilson	51	1995–96
10	Dan Nolan	49	1983–84
	Chris Brown	49	1999–00
	Chris Brown	49	2001–02

Single game
Rk	Player	Steals	Season	Opponent
1	Al McClain	8	1982–83	Canisius

== Blocks ==
Career
Rk	Player	Blocks	Seasons
1	Rob Marquardt	123	1997–98 1998–99 1999–00 2000–01
2	Brian Benson	78	2008–09 2009–10 2010–11 2011–12
3	Chris Pelcher	75	2012–13 2013–14
4	Jayden Martinez	65	2018–19 2019–20 2020–21 2021–22
5	Mike Keeler	60	1978–79 1979–80 1980–81 1981–82
	Tyrece Gibbs	60	2005–06 2006–07 2007–08 2008–09
7	Scott Drapeau	56	1993–94 1994–95
8	Joe Rainis	51	1979–80 1980–81 1981–82 1982–83
	Ferg Myrick	51	2009–10 2010–11 2011–12 2012–13
10	Iba Camara	50	2014–15 2015–16 2016–17 2017–18

Season
Rk	Player	Blocks	Season
1	Rob Marquardt	52	1999–00
2	Mike Keeler	41	1979–80
	Chris Pelcher	41	2013–14
4	Chris Pelcher	34	2012–13
5	Rob Marquardt	33	2000–01
6	Brian Benson	32	2010–11
	Rob Marquardt	32	1998–99
8	Scott Drapeau	30	1993–94
9	Joe Rainis	29	1982–83
	James Ben	29	1991–92
