= Carol Ann Conboy =

American judge

Associate Justice of the New Hampshire Supreme Court
- In office July 8, 2009 – July 1, 2017
- Appointed by: John H. Lynch
- Succeeded by: Anna Hantz Marconi

Judge of the New Hampshire Superior Court
- In office 1992–2009

Personal details
- Born: Carol Ann Knott; July 10, 1947 (age 78)
- Spouse: Edward J. Conboy
- Education: University of Connecticut (BA); University of New Hampshire (JD)

Military service
- Branch/service: United States Air Force
- Years of service: 1969-1971
- Rank: First Lieutenant

Carol Ann Conboy (born July 10, 1947) is an American lawyer, former teacher, and former justice of the New Hampshire Supreme Court.

== Education ==
She graduated from the University of Connecticut with a Bachelor of Arts in 1969 and from the Franklin Pierce Law Center, now known as University of New Hampshire School of Law with a Juris Doctor in 1978.

== Military service ==
After graduating from the University of Connecticut, she joined the United States Air Force and went to Officer Training School at Lackland Air Force Base in Texas. She was commissioned as an officer and served in Boston during the Vietnam War era until resigning her commission as a First Lieutenant in 1971.

== Teaching career ==
She taught English at Merrimack Valley High School in Penacook and Southside Junior High School in Manchester.

== Law career ==
From 1978 to 1979, she clerked for then-Chief Judge Shane Devine of the United States District Court for the District of New Hampshire. From 1980 to 1992, she was a partner in the New Hampshire law firm of McLane, Graf, Raulerson and Middleton. From 1992 to 2009, she served as a Judge on the New Hampshire Superior Court.

While on the Superior Court, she was a Supervisory Justice of the Merrimack County Superior Court and served as Chair of the New Hampshire Supreme Court Advisory Committee on Judicial Ethics, and Chair of the New Hampshire Superior Court Sentence Review Board.

In 2009, Governor John Lynch nominated her to serve as an associate justice on the New Hampshire Supreme Court. She was sworn in on July 8, 2009 and served on the court until her retirement on July 1, 2017.

== Personal life ==
Carol married Edward J. Conboy while in the Air Force. Together they had three children (Thomas, Paul, and David). Edward died on April 15, 2009.
