= 1979–80 New Hampshire Wildcats men's basketball team =

American college basketball season

1979–80 New Hampshire Wildcats men's basketball
- Conference: ECAC North
- Record: 4–22 (0–0 ECAC North)
- Head coach: Gerry Friel (11th season)
- Home arena: Lundholm Gym

1979–80 ECAC North men's basketball standings
	Conf.				Overall
Team	W		L	PCT	W		L	PCT
Boston University	19	–	7	.731	21	–	9	.700
Northeastern	19	–	7	.731	19	–	8	.704
Holy Cross †	16	–	10	.615	19	–	11	.633
Rhode Island	14	–	12	.538	15	–	13	.536
Maine	14	–	12	.538	15	–	13	.536
Canisius	13	–	13	.500	13	–	14	.481
Vermont	4	–	4	.500	12	–	15	.444
Niagara	11	–	15	.423	11	–	16	.407
Colgate	8	–	17	.320	8	–	17	.320
New Hampshire	4	–	22	.154	4	–	22	.154
† 1980 ECAC North tournament winner

The 1979–80 New Hampshire Wildcats men's basketball team represented the University of New Hampshire during the 1979–80 NCAA Division I men's basketball season. The Wildcats, led by eleventh year head coach Gerry Friel, played their home games at Lundholm Gym and were members of the ECAC North, however the conference did not conduct conference play for the 1979–80 season. They finished the season 4–22 to finish in tenth place. They did not qualify for the ECAC North tournament.

== Roster ==
Name	Position	Height	Year	Min	Pts	Reb	Ast	Stl	Blk	FG%	FT%
Jack Burns	Forward	6–7	So.	12.5	3.0	1.8	0.2	0.2	0.0	52.5%	66.7%
Dana Chapman	Guard	6–1	Jr.	19.7	9.6	1.6	1.1	0.8	0.0	40.4%	70.8%
A.J. DeFusco	Guard/Forward	N/A	Fr.	2.8	0.5	0.5	0.5	0.0	0.0	14.3%	N/A
Robin Dixon	Guard	6–3	Fr.	23.0	10.1	2.4	1.8	0.8	0.3	42.5%	60.6%
Paul Dufour	Guard	6–2	Sr.	30.8	10.6	2.2	2.2	1.0	0.0	50.4%	83.3%
Chris Gildea	Forward	6–6	So.	18.2	4.3	2.8	1.4	0.4	0.2	49.4%	69.8%
Karl Hicks	Forward	6–5	So.	12.7	3.3	2.0	0.5	0.3	0.1	37.5%	88.2%
Mike Keeler	Center	6–8	So.	31.1	10.8	7.1	0.4	0.5	1.6	47.9%	54.3%
Randy Kinzly	Guard	6–2	So.	20.8	4.7	1.7	2.6	0.7	0.0	51.9%	83.7%
Bob Neely	Forward	6–4	Fr.	25.9	7.0	4.6	0.9	1.0	0.6	36.3%	68.5%
Brady Otey	Forward	6–4	So.	13.5	3.9	2.2	0.6	0.5	0.1	30.7%	51.6%
John Quinn	Center	6–8	Jr.	9.2	2.0	1.7	0.5	0.2	0.1	45.9%	50.0%
Joe Rainis	Center	6–9	Fr.	10.7	1.9	1.4	0.4	0.0	0.1	35.7%	60.0%

== Schedule ==
Date time, TV	Opponent	Result	Record	Site city, state
Regular season
Nov. 30, 1979*	vs. Brown; Brown Tap–Off Tournament	L 56–67	0–1	Providence Civic Center; Providence, RI
Dec. 1, 1979*	vs. Robert Morris; Brown Tap–Off Tournament	W 58–55	1–1	Providence Civic Center; Providence, RI
Dec. 4, 1979*	at Connecticut	L 62–71	1–2	Hartford Civic Center; Hartford, CT
Dec. 7, 1979*	at Springfield	L 70–84	1–3	Blake Arena; Springfield, MA
Dec. 12, 1979	Maine	L 55–70	1–4	Lundholm Gym; Durham, NH
Dec. 15, 1979*	at Saint Peter's	L 34–72	1–5	Yanitelli Center; Jersey City, NJ
Dec. 28, 1979*	vs. Austin Peay; Poinsettia Classic	L 60–69	1–6	Memorial Auditorium; Greenville, SC
Dec. 29, 1979*	vs. Evansville; Poinsettia Classic	L 72–86	1–7	Memorial Auditorium; Greenville, SC
Jan. 3, 1980*	Connecticut	W 67–59	2–7	Lundholm Gym; Durham, NH
Jan. 5, 1980*	vs. Boston College	L 69–97	2–8	Cumberland County Civic Center; Portland, ME
Jan. 7, 1980*	at Providence	L 48–71	2–9	Providence Civic Center; Providence, RI
Jan. 11, 1980	Vermont	L 70–84	2–10	Lundholm Gym; Durham, NH
Jan. 17, 1980*	Saint Anselm	L 50–52	2–11	Lundholm Gym; Durham, NH
Jan. 19, 1980	at Boston University	L 59–82	2–12	Case Gym; Boston, MA
Jan. 23, 1980*	at Yale	L 62–81	2–13	John J. Lee Amphitheater; New Haven, CT
Jan. 28, 1980	Northeastern	L 63–73	2–14	Cabot Center; Boston, MA
Jan. 30, 1980	Rhode Island	L 63–86	2–15	Lundholm Gym; Durham, NH
Feb. 1, 1980	Colgate	L 58–59	2–16	Cotterell Court; Hamilton, NY
Feb. 5, 1980	at Maine	L 54–65	2–17	Alfond Arena; Orono, ME
Feb. 7, 1980	at Holy Cross	L 86–97	2–18	Hart Center; Worcester, MA
Feb. 10, 1980	Northeastern	L 68–69	2–19	Lundholm Gym; Durham, NH
Feb. 12, 1980*	at Dartmouth	W 55–54	3–19	Alumni Gym; Hanover, NH
Feb 16, 1980	Boston University	L 76–102	3–20	Lundholm Gym; Durham, NH
Feb 18, 1980*	at UMass	L 63–69	3–21	Curry Hicks Cage; Amherst, MA
Feb 21, 1980	at Vermont	L 76–103	3–22	Patrick Gym; Burlington, VT
Feb 23, 1980*	Siena	W 72–70	4–22	Lundholm Gym; Durham, NH
*Non-conference game. ^{#}Rankings from AP Poll. (#) Tournament seedings in parentheses. All times are in Eastern Time.
