= Bob Tewksbury =

American baseball player (born 1960)

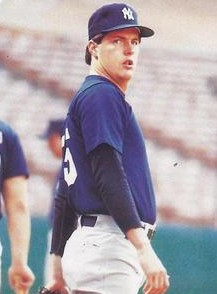
- Pitcher
- Born: November 30, 1960 (age 65); Concord, New Hampshire, U.S.
- Batted: Right Threw: Right

MLB debut
- April 11, 1986, for the New York Yankees

Last MLB appearance
- September 26, 1998, for the Minnesota Twins

MLB statistics
- Win–loss record: 110–102
- Earned run average: 3.92
- Strikeouts: 812
- Stats at Baseball Reference

Teams
- New York Yankees (1986–1987); Chicago Cubs (1987–1988); St. Louis Cardinals (1989–1994); Texas Rangers (1995); San Diego Padres (1996); Minnesota Twins (1997–1998)

Career highlights and awards
- All-Star (1992)

Robert Alan Tewksbury (born November 30, 1960) is an American former professional baseball pitcher. He played in Major League Baseball (MLB) for the New York Yankees, Chicago Cubs, St. Louis Cardinals, Texas Rangers, San Diego Padres and the Minnesota Twins.

Bob Tewksbury has the second-lowest ratio of base on balls per innings pitched for any starting pitcher to pitch in the major leagues since the 1920s, and the lowest ratio for any pitcher to pitch since the 1800s except for Deacon Phillippe, Babe Adams, Dan Quisenberry, and Addie Joss.

== Early life ==
Tewksbury was born in Concord, New Hampshire and attended Merrimack Valley High School in Penacook, New Hampshire. He played college baseball at Rutgers and Saint Leo University. In 1979 and 1980, he played collegiate summer baseball with the Wareham Gatemen of the Cape Cod Baseball League, and was named a league all-star in 1979.

== Playing career ==
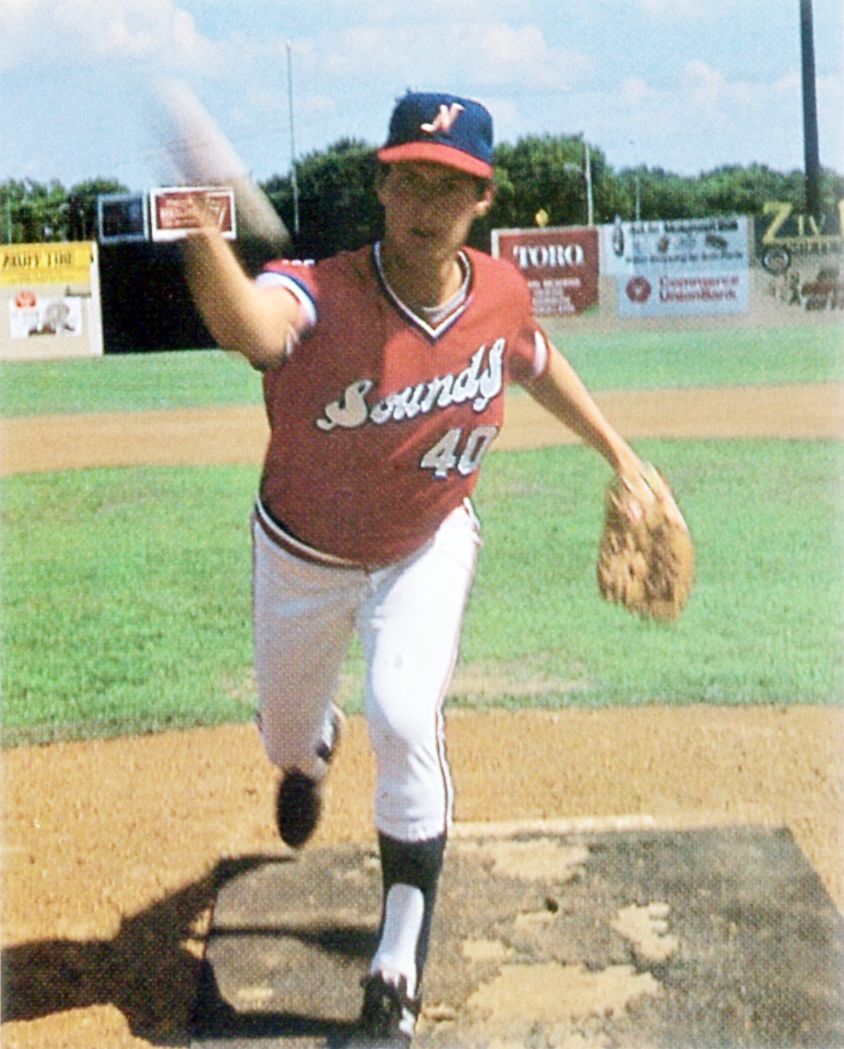
Tewksbury with the Nashville Sounds in 1984

Tewksbury was drafted by the NY Yankees out of Saint Leo University in the 19th round of the 1981 Major League Baseball draft. He earned a spot in the Yankees' rotation in 1986 after pitching 20 straight scoreless innings in spring training. In his major league debut on April 11, 1986, he allowed two runs in 7 1/3 innings against the Milwaukee Brewers, was credited with the win in New York's 3–2 victory, and received a standing ovation from the fans at Yankee Stadium. After the game, team owner George Steinbrenner sent him a bottle of champagne, which the pitcher never opened and kept as a souvenir. He played for the Yankees for two years, and was then sent to the Chicago Cubs. As a free agent in 1988, he signed with the St. Louis Cardinals, where he would stay until 1994. Again a free agent, he went to the Texas Rangers for a year. In 1996, he signed with the San Diego Padres for one more year. In December 1996, he signed with the Minnesota Twins and played for two years with the team, but shoulder problems effectively ended his baseball career after that.

Due to the shoulder and arm problems he faced over the course of his playing career, Tewksbury became known as an excellent control pitcher. His best year was 1992, in which he went 16–5 on the season and had a 2.16 ERA in 233 innings pitched. He appeared in the All-Star game and was third in the Cy Young Award voting that year. His injury problems marred his success from that point forward, with his best post-Cardinals year being in San Diego, where he helped the Padres capture the NL West division title.

In 1992 Tewksbury walked only 20 batters in 233 innings, the best ratio in the major leagues in over half a century. The next season Tewksbury came very close to ending the season with more wins than bases on balls allowed, an elusive feat only accomplished 4 times by 3 different starting pitchers in MLB history. He had 17 wins with only 18 walks allowed late in the season but gave up a walk apiece in his last two starts and did not achieve a win in either game, ending the season with 17 wins on 20 walks. Tewksbury has the third-lowest career walks per 9 innings for any MLB pitcher that pitched after 1927 behind only Josh Tomlin who pitched in the 21st century and famed relief pitcher Dan Quisenberry.

Tewksbury was a better than average fielding pitcher in his major league career. He recorded a career .980 fielding percentage with only 10 errors in 492 total chances covering 1,807 innings pitched over 302 pitching appearances, which was 24 points higher than the league average at his position.

Tewksbury was primarily a starting pitcher (302 appearances, 277 as a starter) but on April 13, 1990, he picked up his one and only save. Tewksbury pitched the final 3 innings of a 11-0 Cardinals victory over the Phillies. He saved the game for starting pitcher John Tudor.

During and after his baseball career, he became well known for his philanthropy. He has done a lot of work for the Boys & Girls Clubs of America, as well as hospital visits for sick children.

== Pitching style ==
Tewksbury was a "changeup artist," according to Rory Costello of the Society for American Baseball Research. Since his fastball was relatively slow, he relied on deception and strategic location of his pitches to win ballgames. He was not afraid of the ball getting hit, realizing that most balls put in play are outs. Tewksbury would also vary the speeds of his offerings to frustrate the batters' timing. In 1997, the ever-crafty Tewksbury threw an Eephus pitch, joining an elite few who have thrown the "junkiest pitch in baseball." He threw it to power-hitter Mark McGwire in an interleague play game at the Hubert H. Humphrey Metrodome and McGwire grounded out on the pitch – twice. Tewksbury's son, Griffin, has been quoted as calling this pitch "The Dominator."

== After retirement ==
After retiring, Tewksbury worked as a player development consultant for the Boston Red Sox and appeared as a commentator for Red Sox coverage on the New England Sports Network He earned his Bachelor of Science degree in physical education at St. Leo University in 2000 and earned his master's degree in psychology at Boston University in 2004.

Tewksbury has been a sports psychology coach since 2004. After earning a master's degree in the subject from Boston University, he served as the sports psychology consultant for the Boston Red Sox and, later, the San Francisco Giants and Chicago Cubs. He is an Adjunct Professor of Sport Psychology & Exercise at NHTI, Concord's Community College. Tewksbury lives in Maine, continuing his charitable work.

Tewksbury played himself in the movie The Scout.

== Awards and honors ==
Tewksbury was inducted into the Saint Leo Sports Hall of Fame in 1998. In 2018, he became one of the inaugural members of the Merrimack Valley High School Hall of Fame.

== See also ==
- List of St. Louis Cardinals team records
- List of Major League Baseball career wins leaders
