= 1980 ECAC North men's basketball tournament =

- Classification: Division I
- Season: 1979–80
- Teams: 8
- Champions: Holy Cross (1st title)
- Winning coach: George Blaney (1st title)
- MVP: Ron Perry (Holy Cross)
- ECAC North men's basketball tournaments

1979–80 ECAC North men's basketball standings
	Conf.				Overall
Team	W		L	PCT	W		L	PCT
Boston University	19	–	7	.731	21	–	9	.700
Northeastern	19	–	7	.731	19	–	8	.704
Holy Cross †	16	–	10	.615	19	–	11	.633
Rhode Island	14	–	12	.538	15	–	13	.536
Maine	14	–	12	.538	15	–	13	.536
Canisius	13	–	13	.500	13	–	14	.481
Vermont	4	–	4	.500	12	–	15	.444
Niagara	11	–	15	.423	11	–	16	.407
Colgate	8	–	17	.320	8	–	17	.320
New Hampshire	4	–	22	.154	4	–	22	.154
† 1980 ECAC North tournament winner

The 1980 ECAC North men's basketball tournament was hosted by the higher seeds in head-to-head matchups. It was the inaugural tournament ever held for the ECAC North. The final was held at The Hart Center on the campus at the College of Holy Cross. Holy Cross gained their first and only America East Conference Championship in the first ever tournament as well as an automatic berth to the NCAA tournament with its win over Boston University. Holy Cross was given the 11th seed in the East Regional of the NCAA Tournament and lost in the first round to Maryland 84–78. Boston University gained a bid to the NIT and lost in the first round to Boston College 95–74.

== Bracket and Results ==
Quarterfinals
Holy Cross	90
Vermont	74
Maine	66
Northeastern	52
Boston University	95
Niagara	86
Rhode Island	83
Canisius	67

Semifinals
Holy Cross	73
Maine	67
Boston University	83
Rhode Island	79

Finals
Holy Cross	81
Boston University	75

== See also ==
- America East Conference
- 1980 ECAC South men's basketball tournament
