= 1979–80 Holy Cross Crusaders men's basketball team =

American college basketball season

1979–80 Holy Cross Crusaders men's basketball

ECAC North tournament champions

NCAA tournament, first round
- Conference: East Coast Athletic Conference
- Record: 19–11 (4–0 ECAC-N)
- Head coach: George Blaney (8th season)
- Home arena: Hart Center

1979–80 ECAC North men's basketball standings
	Conf.				Overall
Team	W		L	PCT	W		L	PCT
Boston University	19	–	7	.731	21	–	9	.700
Northeastern	19	–	7	.731	19	–	8	.704
Holy Cross †	16	–	10	.615	19	–	11	.633
Rhode Island	14	–	12	.538	15	–	13	.536
Maine	14	–	12	.538	15	–	13	.536
Canisius	13	–	13	.500	13	–	14	.481
Vermont	4	–	4	.500	12	–	15	.444
Niagara	11	–	15	.423	11	–	16	.407
Colgate	8	–	17	.320	8	–	17	.320
New Hampshire	4	–	22	.154	4	–	22	.154
† 1980 ECAC North tournament winner

The 1979–80 Holy Cross Crusaders men's basketball team represented the College of the Holy Cross during the 1979–80 NCAA Division I men's basketball season. The Crusaders, led by head coach George Blaney, played their home games at the Hart Center and were members of the East Coast Athletic Conference – North. They finished the season 19–11, 4–0 in ECAC-South play to finish in third place. They defeated Vermont, Maine, and Boston University to win the ECAC North tournament and earn the conference's automatic bid to the NCAA tournament. As No. 11 seed in the East region, they lost to Iona in the opening round, 84–78.

== Roster ==
1979–80 Holy Cross Crusaders men's basketball team
Players
Coaches

Pos.	#	Name	Height	Weight	Year	Previous school	Hometown
G	15	Ron Perry	6 ft 2 in (1.88 m)	—	Sr	Catholic Memorial	Boston, Massachusetts
F	20	Garry Witts	6 ft 7 in (2.01 m)	185 lb (84 kg)	Jr	St. Joseph	Metuchen, New Jersey

Head coach

- George Blaney (Holy Cross)

Assistant coach(es)

Legend

- (C) Team captain
- (S) Suspended
- (I) Ineligible
- (W) Walk-on
- Injured
- Current redshirt

Roster

== Schedule and results ==
Date time, TV	Rank^{#}	Opponent^{#}	Result	Record	Site (attendance) city, state
Regular season
Dec 2, 1979*		Catholic	W 57–48	1–0	Hart Recreation Center; Worcester, Massachusetts
Dec 4, 1979*		at Saint Peter's	L 62–73	1–1	Yanitelli Center; Jersey City, New Jersey
Dec 8, 1979*		at Yale	W 97–87	2–1	Payne Whitney Gymnasium; New Haven, Connecticut
Dec 15, 1979*		No. 3 Ohio State	L 63–79	2–2	Hart Recreation Center; Worcester, Massachusetts
Dec 18, 1979*		Harvard	L 80–81	2–3	Hart Recreation Center; Worcester, Massachusetts
Dec 22, 1979*		Canisius	W 89–79	3–3	Hart Recreation Center; Worcester, Massachusetts
Dec 28, 1979*		Assumption; Worcester County Classic	W 122–84	4–3	Hart Recreation Center; Worcester, Massachusetts
Dec 29, 1979*		Hofstra; Worcester County Classic	W 97–84	5–3	Hart Recreation Center; Worcester, Massachusetts
Jan 5, 1980*		St. Francis Brooklyn	W 79–53	6–3	Hart Recreation Center; Worcester, Massachusetts
Jan 9, 1980*		at Florida Southern	L 81–83	6–4	George W. Jenkins Field House; Lakeland, Florida
Jan 12, 1980*		at Providence	W 59–57	7–4	Providence Civic Center; Providence, Rhode Island
Jan 14, 1980*		at Duquesne	L 88–103	7–5	Civic Arena; Pittsburgh, Pennsylvania
Jan 16, 1980*		at Vermont	W 76–71	8–5	Patrick Gym; Burlington, Vermont
Jan 19, 1980*		vs. Rhode Island	W 76–73	9–5	Boston Garden; Boston, Massachusetts
Jan 22, 1980*		vs. Fairfield	W 59–57	10–5	New Haven Coliseum; New Haven, Connecticut
Jan 26, 1980*		Iona	L 67–82	10–6	Hart Recreation Center; Worcester, Massachusetts
Jan 29, 1980*		Dartmouth	W 101–69	11–6	Hart Recreation Center; Worcester, Massachusetts
Feb 1, 1980*		vs. Massachusetts; Colonial Classic	W 84–73	12–6	Boston Garden; Boston, Massachusetts
Feb 2, 1980*		vs. Boston College; Colonial Classic	L 83–92	12–7	Boston Garden; Boston, Massachusetts
Feb 4, 1980*		at Manhattan	W 75–56	13–7	Draddy Gymnasium; Bronx, New York
Feb 7, 1980*		New Hampshire	W 97–86	14–7	Hart Recreation Center; Worcester, Massachusetts
Feb 9, 1980*		at Boston College	W 72–69	15–7	Roberts Center; Chestnut Hill, Massachusetts
Feb 16, 1980*		at Seton Hall	L 75–77	15–8	Walsh Gymnasium; South Orange, New Jersey
Feb 20, 1980*		Connecticut	L 70–88	15–9	Hart Recreation Center; Worcester, Massachusetts
Feb 21, 1980*		Fordham	W 83–72	16–9	Hart Recreation Center; Worcester, Massachusetts
Feb 23, 1980*		at Georgetown	L 78–105	16–10	McDonough Gymnasium; Washington, D.C.
ECAC North tournament
Feb 26, 1980*		Vermont; Quarterfinals	W 90–74	17–10	Hart Recreation Center; Worcester, Massachusetts
Feb 28, 1980*		at Maine; Semifinals	W 73–67	18–10	Alfond Arena; Orono, Maine
Mar 1, 1980*		Boston University; Championship game	W 81–75	19–10	Hart Recreation Center; Worcester, Massachusetts
NCAA tournament
Mar 7, 1980*	(11 E)	vs. (6 E) No. 19 Iona; First round	L 78–84	19–11	Providence Civic Center; Providence, Rhode Island
*Non-conference game. ^{#}Rankings from AP Poll. (#) Tournament seedings in parentheses. E=East. All times are in Eastern Time..
