= Cora Faith Walker =

American politician (c. 1984–2022)

Member of the Missouri House of Representatives from the 74th district
- In office January 4, 2017 – July 29, 2019
- Preceded by: Sharon Pace
- Succeeded by: Michael Person

Personal details
- Born: Cora Faith Drew; November 5, 1984 St. Louis, Missouri
- Died: March 11, 2022 (aged 37) St. Louis, Missouri, U.S.
- Party: Democratic
- Spouse: Tim Walker
- Education: Washington University in St. Louis (BA, MPH); Saint Louis University (JD)

Cora Faith Walker (née Drew; November 5, 1984 – March 11, 2022) was an American politician who served as a member of the Missouri House of Representatives for the 74th district from January 2017 to July 2019. On July 29, 2019, Walker resigned from the Missouri House of Representatives and became the policy director for St. Louis County executive Sam Page.

Walker earned a Bachelor of Arts from the Washington University in St. Louis, a Master of Public Health from Washington University's George Warren Brown School of Social Work and a Juris Doctor and health law certificate from the Saint Louis University School of Law.

Walker lived in Ferguson, Missouri. On March 11, 2022, Walker collapsed at a hotel in St. Louis, where she had attended a birthday party for Mayor Tishaura Jones. She was taken to a hospital, where she was pronounced dead, aged 37. The cause of death was determined to have been non-ischemic cardiomyopathy.
