= Michael Person =

American politician

Member of the Missouri House of Representatives from the 74th district
- In office January 8, 2020 – January 4, 2023
- Preceded by: Cora Faith Walker
- Succeeded by: Kevin Windham Jr. (redistricting)

Personal details
- Born: 1956 or 1957 (age 69–70)
- Party: Democratic
- Education: Missouri University of Science and Technology (BS)

Michael Person (born 1956 or 1957) is an American politician who served as a member of the Missouri House of Representatives from the 74th district. Elected in November 2019, he assumed office in January 2020. After winning a full term in November 2020, redistricting of 2022 placed his home in district 73, with fellow incumbent Raychel Proudie, and Person lost the next primary to Proudie. As such, his tenure in the House ended in January 2023.

== Education ==
Person earned a Bachelor of Science degree in mechanical engineering from the Missouri University of Science and Technology in 1978, known then as the University of Missouri–Rolla.

== Career ==
Person was a member of the Riverview Gardens School Board from 2004 to 2007. He has worked as a torchlighter for United Way and a diversity and inclusion facilitator for Ameren. He also served as a member of the Ferguson Township Democratic Committee. After his state representative resigned, Person was selected as a candidate by a Democratic committee and was elected to the Missouri House of Representatives in a November 2019 special election, assuming office on January 8, 2020. Two House Democrats expressed concern that Person's nomination meeting was held at his own home. In response, Person said another location was too small and he had hosted party functions previously.

== Electoral history ==
Missouri House of Representatives Special Election, November 5, 2019, District 74
Party	Candidate	Votes	%	±%
Democratic	Mike Person	813	57.33%	
Libertarian	Nicholas Kasoff	605	42.67%	
Total votes		1,418	100.00%	

Missouri House of Representatives Primary Election, August 4, 2020, District 74
Party	Candidate	Votes	%	±%
Democratic	Mike Person	1,944	37.35%	
Democratic	Yolonda (Yonnee) Fortson	1,807	34.72%	
Democratic	Gary Johnson	1,454	27.93%	
Total votes		5,205	100.00%	

Missouri House of Representatives Election, November 3, 2020, District 74
Party	Candidate	Votes	%	±%
Democratic	Mike Person	11,153	100.00%	0.00
Total votes		11,153	100.00%	

Missouri of Representatives Primary Election, August 2, 2022, District 73
Party	Candidate	Votes	%	±%
Democratic	Raychel Proudie	2,005	62.02%	n/a
Democratic	Mike Person	1,228	37.98%	+0.63
Total votes		3,233	100.00%	
