= Vivian Hall =

American politician

Member-elect of the New Hampshire House of Representatives from the Merrimack 3rd district
- Assuming office December 2026
- Succeeding: Bryan Morse

Personal details
- Party: Democratic

Vivian Hall is an American politician. A member of the Democratic Party, she is the member-elect for the Merrimack 3rd district of the New Hampshire House of Representatives.
