= Kennedy Moore =

American politician

Member-elect of the Missouri House of Representatives from the 73rd district
- Assuming office January 6, 2027
- Succeeding: Raychel Proudie

Personal details
- Party: Democratic
- Education: University of Missouri, Columbia; University of Missouri–St. Louis
- Website: Campaign website

Kennedy Moore is an American politician of the Missouri Democratic Party who is the representative-elect for the 73rd district in the Missouri House of Representatives. She was elected in the 2026 general election. She is a community organizer in St. Louis.
