= Raychel Proudie =

American politician (born 1983)

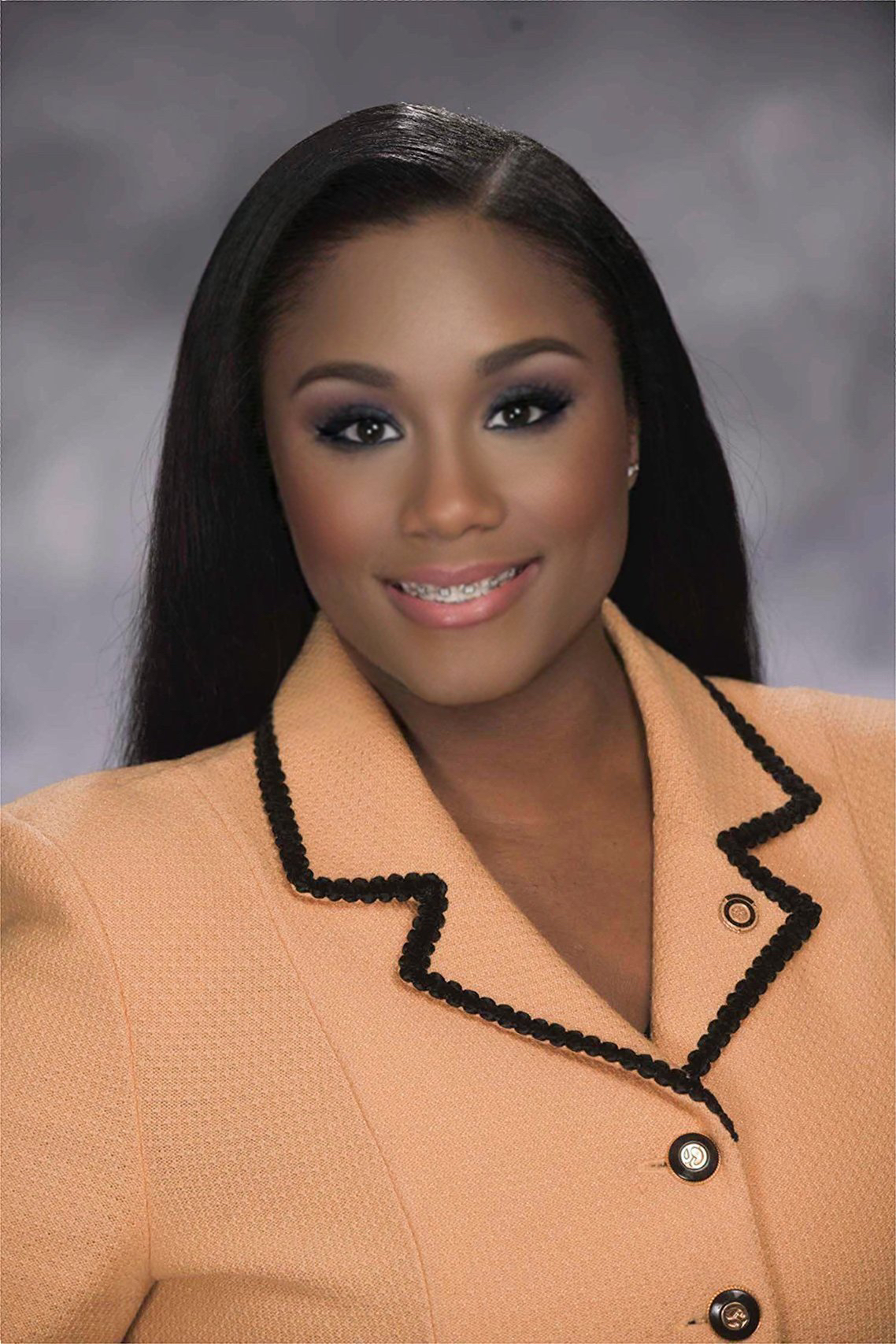

Member of the Missouri House of Representatives from the 73rd district
- Incumbent
- Assumed office 9 January 2019
- Preceded by: Courtney Allen Curtis
- Succeeded by: Kennedy Moore (elect)

Personal details
- Born: May 26, 1983 (age 43) Castle Point, Missouri, U.S.
- Party: Democratic
- Education: Grambling State University (BS, EdD); Southern University and A&M College (MA)
- Occupation: Teacher, School Counselor

Raychel Crystal Proudie (born May 26, 1983) is an American politician who is a member of the Missouri House of Representatives from the 73rd district in St. Louis County.

== Career ==
Proudie won the nomination in the Democratic primary on August 7, 2018, prevailing with 57% of the vote in a three-way contest. She was elected unopposed on November 6, 2018 from the platform of the Democratic Party. She was re-elected in 2020, 2022, and 2024. Proudie was elected as an Uncommitted delegate to the Democratic National Convention in the 2024 Missouri Democratic presidential primary.

== Electoral history ==
Missouri House of Representatives Primary Election, August 7, 2018, District 73
Party	Candidate	Votes	%	±%
Democratic	Raychel Proudie	3,130	56.69%	
Democratic	Floyd Blackwell	1,253	22.70%	
Democratic	Lee Smith	1,138	20.61%	
Total votes		5,521	100.00%	

Missouri House of Representatives Election, November 6, 2018, District 73
Party	Candidate	Votes	%	±%
Democratic	Raychel Proudie	9,475	100.00%	
Total votes		9,475	100.00%	

Missouri House of Representatives Election, November 3, 2020, District 73
Party	Candidate	Votes	%	±%
Democratic	Raychel Proudie	10,933	100.00%	0.00
Total votes		10,933	100.00%	

Missouri House of Representatives Primary Election, August 2, 2022, District 73
Party	Candidate	Votes	%	±%
Democratic	Raychel Proudie	2,005	62.02%	
Democratic	Mike Person	1,228	37.98%	
Total votes		3,233	100.00%	

Missouri House of Representatives Election, November 8, 2022, District 73
Party	Candidate	Votes	%	±%
Democratic	Raychel Proudie	6,741	100.00%	0.00
Total votes		6,741	100.00%	
