= Sean Eberhart =

American politician from Indiana

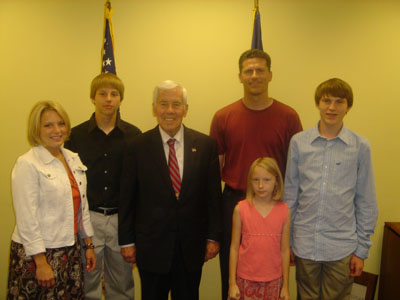
- The Eberhart family with Richard Lugar in 2007

Member of the Indiana House of Representatives from the 57th district
- In office 2007–2022
- Preceded by: Luke Messer
- Succeeded by: Craig Haggard

Personal details
- Born: January 21, 1966 (age 60) Shelbyville, Indiana, US
- Party: Republican
- Spouse: Rebecca Eberhart
- Education: Purdue University (BS); Indiana University Indianapolis (MBA)
- Occupation: Small business owner

Sean R. Eberhart (born 1966) is an American politician and businessperson. He was a Republican member of the Indiana House of Representatives, representing the 57th District, from 2007 to 2022. He served on the Shelby County Council from 1998 to 2006, and as its president from 2003 to 2006. He served on the County Council's 4th district. He retired from political life in 2022.

In 2023, he pled guilty to felony charges of corruption for accepting a $350,000 a year job, in exchange for his legislative support for two gambling casinos on Lake Michigan.

== Early life and education ==
Eberhart attended Shelbyville High School.

== See also ==
- List of 2020s American state and local politicians convicted of crimes
