= Scott Drapeau =

American former basketball player

Personal information
- Born: July 25, 1972 (age 54) Penacook, New Hampshire, U.S.
- Listed height: 6 ft 8 in (2.03 m)

Career information
- High school: Merrimack Valley (Penacook, New Hampshire)
- College: UMass (1991); Southern New Hampshire (1992); New Hampshire (1993–1995)
- NBA draft: 1995: undrafted
- Position: Power forward
- Coaching career: 1995–1995

Career history

Coaching
- 2012–2013: Hillsboro-Deering HS (girls)
- 2013–2014: Hillsboro-Deering HS (boys)

Career highlights
- North Atlantic Player of the Year (1994); 2× First-team All-North Atlantic (1994, 1995)

Scott Drapeau (born July 25, 1972) is an American former basketball player known for his collegiate career at the University of New Hampshire (UNH). In just two seasons with the team, Drapeau scored 1,290 points, was a two-time First Team All-North Atlantic Conference selection, and as a junior in 1993–94 was named the NAC Player of the Year.

Prior to UNH, the Penacook, New Hampshire native starred at Merrimack Valley High School. He scored over 2,000 career points before enrolling at UMass as a freshman in 1991–92. After playing for the Minutemen for just one season, Drapeau then transferred to Southern New Hampshire University (then called New Hampshire College) and also played one season there. Drapeau ended up at UNH in 1993–94. The 6'8" power forward is credited with being the cornerstone of the two most successful seasons in UNH men's basketball history. They secured a school-record 19 wins in 1994–95 and went 34–22 between 1993–94 and 1994–95.

Drapeau holds UNH career averages of 23.0 points and 9.8 rebounds, which are second and fourth all-time, respectively, as of the end of the 2012–13 season. He has the top two single season scoring records with 648 and 642 points. He tried to pursue a professional basketball career as he entered the NBA Draft; however, he had torn his ACL but did not tell his agent, which forced him out of the draft and ended his playing career. As of 2017 he resides in Penacook, New Hampshire with his two daughters, son, and wife. In the fall of 2021 he took over the job of Bow high school Boys varsity coach for basketball He is employed as an Activities Officer in a Correctional Facility.
