= Daniel Will =

American judge

Associate Justice of the New Hampshire Supreme Court
- Incumbent
- Assumed office March 4, 2026
- Appointed by: Kelly Ayotte
- Preceded by: Bobbie Hantz Marconi

Personal details
- Born: 1966 or 1967 (age 59–60)
- Education: University of Pennsylvania (BA); Boston College (JD)

Daniel E. Will (born 1966/1967) is an American judge. He has served as an associate justice of the New Hampshire Supreme Court since 2026. He previously served as an associate justice of the New Hampshire Superior Court from 2021 to 2026.

== Life and career ==
Will attended the University of Pennsylvania, earning his bachelor's degree in 1989. He also attended Boston College Law School, earning his JD degree in 1995. After earning his degrees, he worked as a lawyer in New Hampshire.

Will served as an associate justice of the New Hampshire Superior Court from 2021 to 2026. After his service in the superior court, he has served as an associate justice of the New Hampshire Supreme Court since 2026.

Legal offices
Preceded by Bobbie Hantz Marconi	Associate Justice of the New Hampshire Supreme Court; 2026–present	Incumbent
