= Geno Marconi =

American harbor master (born 1951)

Personal details
- Born: September 14, 1951 (age 75)
- Spouse: Anna Hantz Marconi

Geno Marconi (born September 14, 1951) was the Director of Ports and Harbors for the state of New Hampshire. He held this position for several years, overseeing vessel traffic on the Piscataqua River. Marconi’s career has been marked by both accomplishments and controversies, including recent criminal charges and earlier allegations of misconduct. As of April 2024, Marconi has been placed on paid administrative leave.

== Early life ==
Marconi was born on September 14, 1951, to Eugene J. Marconi and Evelyn E. Marconi (née Ladrie). He was raised on the seacoast of New Hampshire, where he worked in the commercial fishing industry with his family. During this time, Marconi operated vessels engaged in harvesting lobster, ground fish, and northern shrimp.

== Career ==
Marconi began his formal maritime career in 1975 when he was appointed Portsmouth Harbor Master. In 1979, his role expanded to include managing the state-owned Portsmouth Commercial Fish Pier. He holds a United States Merchant Marine Officer license as a Master of Vessels under 1600 Gross Tons, with an endorsement for towing vessels. Over the years, Marconi has captained a variety of ships, including coastal cruise ships and towing vessels, operating in regions such as the Pacific Northwest, Southeast Alaska, the Great Lakes, the Canadian Maritimes, and the Caribbean. He is an Accredited Maritime Port Executive (AMPE), certified by the International Association of Maritime and Port Executives (IAMPE). Marconi also serves on the Board of Directors for the North Atlantic Ports Association. Since 1987, he has been a member of the New Hampshire Advisory Committee on Marine Fisheries, a government entity established under N.H. Rev. Stat. § 211:60, becoming its chairman in 2002. Additionally, Marconi has contributed to several state commissions, including New Hampshire’s Offshore Wind Energy Study Commission.

== Recognition ==
In 2023, Geno Marconi received the IAMPE Lifetime Achievement Award for his contributions to the port and maritime industries. He is one of only five individuals to have been honored with this award.

== Controversies ==
=== 2006 Allegations and Reappointment ===
In 2006, Marconi was reappointed as Director of Ports and Harbors despite accusations that he had used racist language in the workplace. He admitted to using a racial slur to describe a ship captain of Middle Eastern descent but denied other allegations of inappropriate comments. After an investigation, Marconi was required to undergo diversity training and issued a public apology, reaffirming his commitment to professionalism. The New Hampshire Executive Council confirmed his reappointment, and Governor John Lynch did not veto the decision, although he described the remarks as "offensive and inappropriate."

Additional allegations were raised regarding Marconi’s management practices, including claims that he misused public resources by using a state-issued vehicle for personal errands and accepting gifts from ship captains and fishermen. The Pease Development Authority reviewed these complaints and determined that Marconi’s actions were within the rules, though they noted that reforms would be considered.

=== 2007 Threats and Legal Fallout ===
Following the 2006 investigation, one of Marconi's accusers, Bill Roach, a longshoreman and president of the New Hampshire chapter of the International Longshoremen’s Association, reported a series of disturbing incidents, including a drive-by shooting at his home, a fake tombstone bearing his initials left at the port, and a cage of dead rats placed outside his house. Despite three separate police investigations, no charges were filed, and Marconi denied any involvement.

Roach, along with other longshoremen, filed a whistleblower lawsuit against the state, claiming that Marconi had retaliated by taking away their port jobs. However, the New Hampshire Supreme Court dismissed the lawsuit, ruling that the longshoremen were contractors rather than state employees and, therefore, were not eligible for whistleblower protections.

=== 2024 Defense by Bradley Cook ===
During a May 1, 2024, Pease Development Authority (PDA) meeting, Bradley Cook, chairman of the Port Advisory Council, defended Marconi. Cook emphasized Marconi’s integrity and professional abilities, noting that the council had unanimously passed a vote of confidence in Marconi. He expressed concerns about the political climate, stating:

"The current political cesspool contains those who will stop at nothing to demonstrate power over anyone who is in disagreement with them and is principled enough to express that disagreement publicly."

Cook highlighted that, despite past policy disagreements, Marconi's honesty was never in question.

== 2024 Criminal Charges ==
In October 2024, Geno Marconi was indicted on two Class B felonies: Tampering with Witnesses and Informants and Falsifying Physical Evidence. He was also indicted on four Class A misdemeanors: two counts of Driver Privacy Act Violations and two counts of Obstructing Government Administration. The New Hampshire Attorney General’s office alleges that Marconi deleted voicemails and provided confidential motor vehicle records to a third party. He has been on paid administrative leave since April 2024.

Bradley Cook, chairman of the Port Advisory Council, was also indicted on a Class B felony for Perjury and two Class A misdemeanors for False Swearing.

Justice Anna Barbara Hantz Marconi, Geno Marconi's wife and a New Hampshire Supreme Court Associate Justice, was also indicted for two Class B felonies: one count of Attempt to Commit Improper Influence and one count of Criminal Solicitation of Improper Influence. She also faces five Class A misdemeanors: two counts of Criminal Solicitation of Misuse of Position, one count of Criminal Solicitation of Official Oppression, one count of Official Oppression, and one count of Obstructing Government Administration. She is accused of attempting to influence the investigation into her husband by soliciting New Hampshire Governor Chris Sununu to expedite its conclusion.

Justice Hantz Marconi has been placed on paid administrative leave since July 25, 2024, and her legal team asserts that she is innocent of the charges.

New Hampshire Attorney General John Formella commented on the case, stating, “The decision to charge a sitting Justice of the New Hampshire Supreme Court was not made lightly, and it comes after careful and thoughtful deliberation. It is my hope that the public will be reassured that all individuals, including public officials, are treated equally under the law.”
