= Jason Dockter =

American politician (born 1973)

Member of the North Dakota House of Representatives from the 7th district
- Incumbent
- Assumed office December 1, 2012
- Preceded by: Jon Nelson
- Succeeded by: Steve Sauter (elect)

Personal details
- Born: August 31, 1973 (age 53) Bismarck, North Dakota, U.S.
- Party: Republican

Jason Dockter (born August 31, 1973) is an American politician who has served in the North Dakota House of Representatives from the 7th district since 2012.
