= Tanner Leissner =

American basketball player (born 1995)

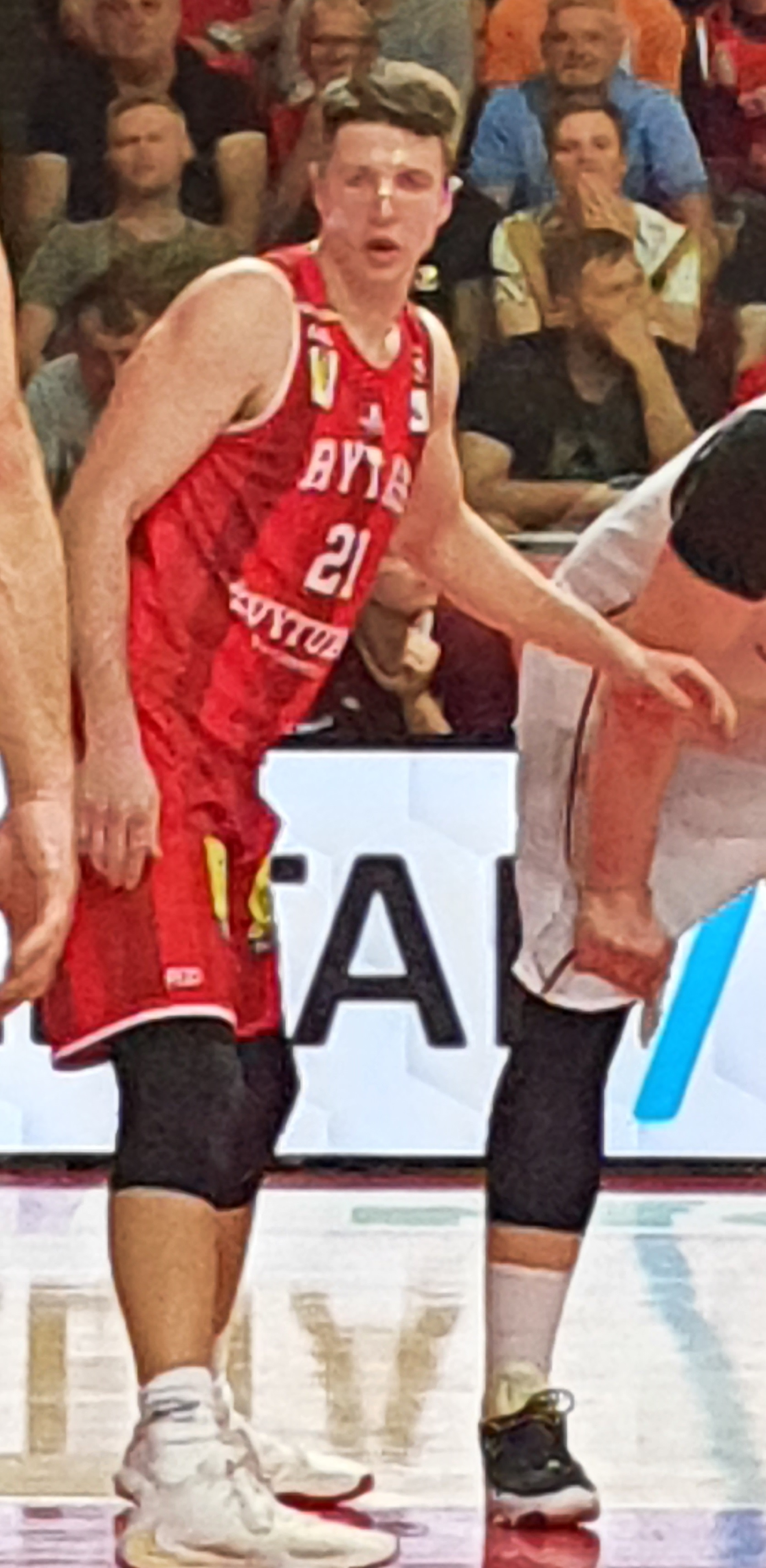
- Leissner with the Rytas Vilnius during the 2022 LKL Finals

No. 15 – Akita Northern Happinets
- Position: Power forward
- League: B.League

Personal information
- Born: September 17, 1995 (age 31)
- Listed height: 6 ft 8 in (2.03 m)
- Listed weight: 232 lb (105 kg)

Career information
- High school: Judson (Converse, Texas)
- College: New Hampshire (2014–2018)
- NBA draft: 2018: undrafted
- Playing career: 2018–present

Career history
- 2018–2019: Ehingen Urspring
- 2019: Hapoel Be'er Sheva
- 2019–2020: MHP Riesen Ludwigsburg
- 2020–2021: Afyon Belediye
- 2021–2022: Rytas
- 2022–2023: EWE Baskets Oldenburg
- 2023: Palencia Baloncesto
- 2023–present: Akita Northern Happinets

Career highlights
- Lithuanian League champion (2022); 3× First-team All-America East (2016–2018); Second-team All-America East (2015); America East Rookie of the Year (2015)

Paul Tanner Leissner (born September 17, 1995) is an American professional basketball player for Akita Northern Happinets of the B.League. He played college basketball for the New Hampshire Wildcats.

== College career ==
Leissner was a four year starter for the New Hampshire Wildcats. As a freshman, he led the team with 12.3 points and 7.2 rebounds per game and was named the America East Conference Rookie of the Year and second team all-conference. He led the team in scoring and finished as the Wildcats' second-leading rebounder with 15.9 points and 7.3 rebounds per game as a sophomore and was named first team All-America East. Leissner was again named first team all-conference in his junior after averaging 17.1 points and 6.9 rebounds and helped lead New Hampshire to the semifinal of the 2017 America East men's basketball tournament. As a senior, he led the Wildcats for a fourth straight year with 18.7 points per game while also averaging 6.9 rebounds per game. He was named first team All-America East for a third consecutive season and awarded UNH Athlete of the Year. Leissner finished his collegiate career as the Wildcats' all-time leader in points (1,962), free throws attempted (675) and made (521), and minutes played (4,095) while also finishing third in rebounds with 862 in 121 games played.

== Professional career ==
=== Ehingen Urspring ===
Leissner signed with Ehingen Urspring of ProA, the German second division, to start his professional career. He finished the ProA season with 16.3 points and 5.4 rebounds over 33 games (32 starts).

=== Hapoel Be'er Sheva ===
Following the end of the ProA season, Leissner signed with Hapoel Be'er Sheva B.C. of the Israeli Basketball Premier League on April 28, 2019. Leissner averaged 9.0 points, 3.4 rebounds and 2.4 assists in seven games for the team.

=== MHP Riesen Ludwigsburg ===
Leissner returned to Germany after signing with MHP Riesen Ludwigsburg of the Basketball Bundesliga (BBL) on August 2, 2019. He averaged 10.2 points and 4.1 rebounds per game in the Bundesliga.

=== Afyon Belediye ===
On August 1, 2020, he signed with Afyon Belediye of the Turkish Basketbol Süper Ligi.

=== Rytas Vilnius ===
On August 3, 2021, he has signed with Rytas Vilnius of the Lithuanian League.

=== EWE Baskets Oldenburg ===
On July 14, 2022, he signed with EWE Baskets Oldenburg of the German Basketball Bundesliga.

=== Palencia Baloncesto ===
On July 31, 2023, Leissner signed with Palencia Baloncesto of the Liga ACB. On November 10, he left the team.

=== Akita Northern Happinets ===
On December 1, 2023, Leissner signed with Akita Northern Happinets of the B.League. On April 9, 2024, his contract was terminated. On May 14, he re-signed with Akita Northern Happinets for 2024–25 season.
