= Bryan Morse (politician) =

American politician

Member of New Hampshire House of Representatives for Merrimack County's 3rd district
- Incumbent
- Assumed office December 4, 2024
- Preceded by: Dave Testerman, James Mason
- Succeeded by: Vivian Hall (elect)

Personal details
- Born: Nashua, New Hampshire
- Party: Republican
- Education: Merrimack High School

Bryan Morse is an American politician. He is a member of the New Hampshire House of Representatives.

== Personal life ==
Bryan is the father of two children. He is married to Samantha Morse, the Register of Deeds for Merrimack County, New Hampshire.

In addition, in 2023, Morse and his wife Samantha were rescued while hiking in the White Mountains.

In November 2026, Morse was convicted by a Hillsborough County Superior Court jury on two felony counts of nonconsensual dissemination of private sexual images. Prosecutors said he posted nude photographs of a woman on Reddit without her consent in May 2025. Sentencing was scheduled for March 2027.
