= Anna Hantz Marconi =

American judge (born 1956)

Bobbie Hantz Marconi

Associate Justice of the New Hampshire Supreme Court
- In office August 8, 2017 – February 12, 2026; Suspended: July 25, 2024 – October 15, 2025; On leave: November 14, 2025 – February 12, 2026
- Appointed by: Chris Sununu
- Preceded by: Carol Ann Conboy
- Succeeded by: Daniel Will

Personal details
- Born: Anna Barbara Hantz; February 12, 1956 (age 70) York, Pennsylvania, U.S.
- Party: Republican
- Spouse: Geno Marconi
- Education: University of New Hampshire (BA); Illinois Institute of Technology (JD)

Anna Barbara "Bobbie" Hantz Marconi (born February 12, 1956) is an American lawyer who served as a justice of the New Hampshire Supreme Court. Marconi was appointed to the court by Governor Chris Sununu in 2017.

Starting in July 2024 she was placed on administrative leave due to the disclosure of a state investigation.

On October 16, 2024, the New Hampshire Attorney General announced that Justice Marconi had been indicted by the Merrimack County Grand Jury for two felonies and five misdemeanors relating to her attempts to interfere with a criminal investigation into her husband, Geno Marconi. In October 2025, all charges were dropped and Justice Hantz Marconi pled no contest to a class B misdemeanor. She returned to the court.

== Early life and education ==
Marconi earned a Bachelor of Arts degree in Political Science in 1977 from the University of New Hampshire and a Juris Doctor in 1992 from Chicago-Kent College of Law. From 1982 until 1984, she served as executive director of the Republican State Committee of New Hampshire and worked on several political campaigns.

== Professional career ==
Marconi served as a law clerk for Maine Supreme Judicial Court Justices Caroline Glassman and Robert B. Clifford. In 2005, she became a member of the Judicial Selection Commission of New Hampshire. Marconi was also a shareholder at Sheehan, Phinney, Bass & Green, P.A., working mainly on civil litigation.

On June 6, 2017, Governor Chris Sununu announced Marconi as his nominee to New Hampshire Supreme Court, replacing retiring Justice Carol Ann Conboy. She was confirmed for the position by State Executive Council on June 21 and was sworn in on August 8.

== Personal life ==
Marconi and her husband Geno Marconi live in Stratham, New Hampshire.

== Criminal indictment ==
On October 16, 2024, the New Hampshire Attorney General announced that Justice Marconi had been indicted by the Merrimack County Grand Jury for two felonies and five misdemeanors relating to her attempts to interfere with a criminal investigation into her husband, Geno Marconi. A year later all charges were dropped and she pleaded no-contest to a single misdemeanor of criminal solicitation. In November 2025 she announced that she would no longer hear cases prior to her retirement in February 2026.

Legal offices
Preceded by Carol Ann Conboy	Associate Justice of the New Hampshire Supreme Court; 2017–2026; Administrative Leave: 2024–2025; Returned to Court: 2025–2026	Succeeded by Daniel Will
