= Clarence Daniels =

American college basketball player

Free agent
- Position: Small forward

Personal information
- Born: December 6, 2000 (age 25)
- Listed height: 6 ft 6 in (1.98 m)
- Listed weight: 210 lb (95 kg)

Career information
- High school: Maranatha Christian Academy (Brooklyn Park, Minnesota)
- College: Montana State Billings (2019–2020); Lake Region State (2021–2022); New Hampshire (2022–2024)
- NBA draft: 2024: undrafted
- Playing career: 2024–present

Career history
- 2024: Elitzur Netanya
- 2024–2025: Antwerp Giants
- 2025-2026: KK Cedevita Junior

Career highlights
- America East Player of the Year (2024); 2× First-team All-America East (2023, 2024); Mon-Dak MVP (2022)

Clarence Oliver Daniels II (born December 6, 2000) is an American professional basketball player who last played for KK Cedevita Junior of the HT Premijer liga. In college, he played for Montana State Billings, Lake Region State College and New Hampshire.

== Early life and high school ==
Daniels attended Maranatha Christian Academy in Brooklyn Park, Minnesota and played on their varsity team. As a senior, during the regular season Daniels averaged 9.5 points and 5.8 rebounds, along with 1.1 assists and 1.6 steals per game. In the post-season section tournament, Daniels averaged 11.3 points and 7.0 rebounds along with 2.3 steals and 1.0 blocks per game. After the season, Daniels was declared a 2018 All-Conference First Team honoree. Daniels committed to play college basketball at Montana State Billings.

== College career ==
Daniels came off the bench for Montana State Billings as a freshman before his sophomore season was cancelled due to the COVID-19 pandemic. He transferred to Lake Region State College after the season. As a sophomore, Daniels averaged 20.5 points and 11.1 rebounds per game. He was named the Mon-Dak Conference MVP and was selected to the NJCAA All-Region XII team. He opted to transfer to New Hampshire after the season. Daniels averaged 15.3 points and 10.7 rebounds per game as a junior. He entered the transfer portal after coach Bill Herrion's contract was not renewed, although Daniels ultimately returned to New Hampshire. He was named America East Player of the Year as a senior.

== Professional career ==
In 2024, Daniels played in the NBA Summer League for the Oklahoma City Thunder. He since has played for numerous overseas teams, such as Elitzur Netanya B.C., Antwerp Giants, and most recently KK Cedevita Junior
