= Merrimack Valley High School =

Coordinates: 43°16′28″N 71°35′34″W

Location
- 106 Village St. Penacook, NH 03303; USA

Information
- Type: Public High School
- Motto: Veritas Est Potentia
- Established: 1967
- Principal: Sam York
- Teaching staff: 56.00 (FTE)
- Enrollment: 784 (2022-2023)
- Campus: Suburban
- Colors: Navy, white and gray
- Mascot: Victor E. Lion
- Nickname: Pride
- Website: MVHS
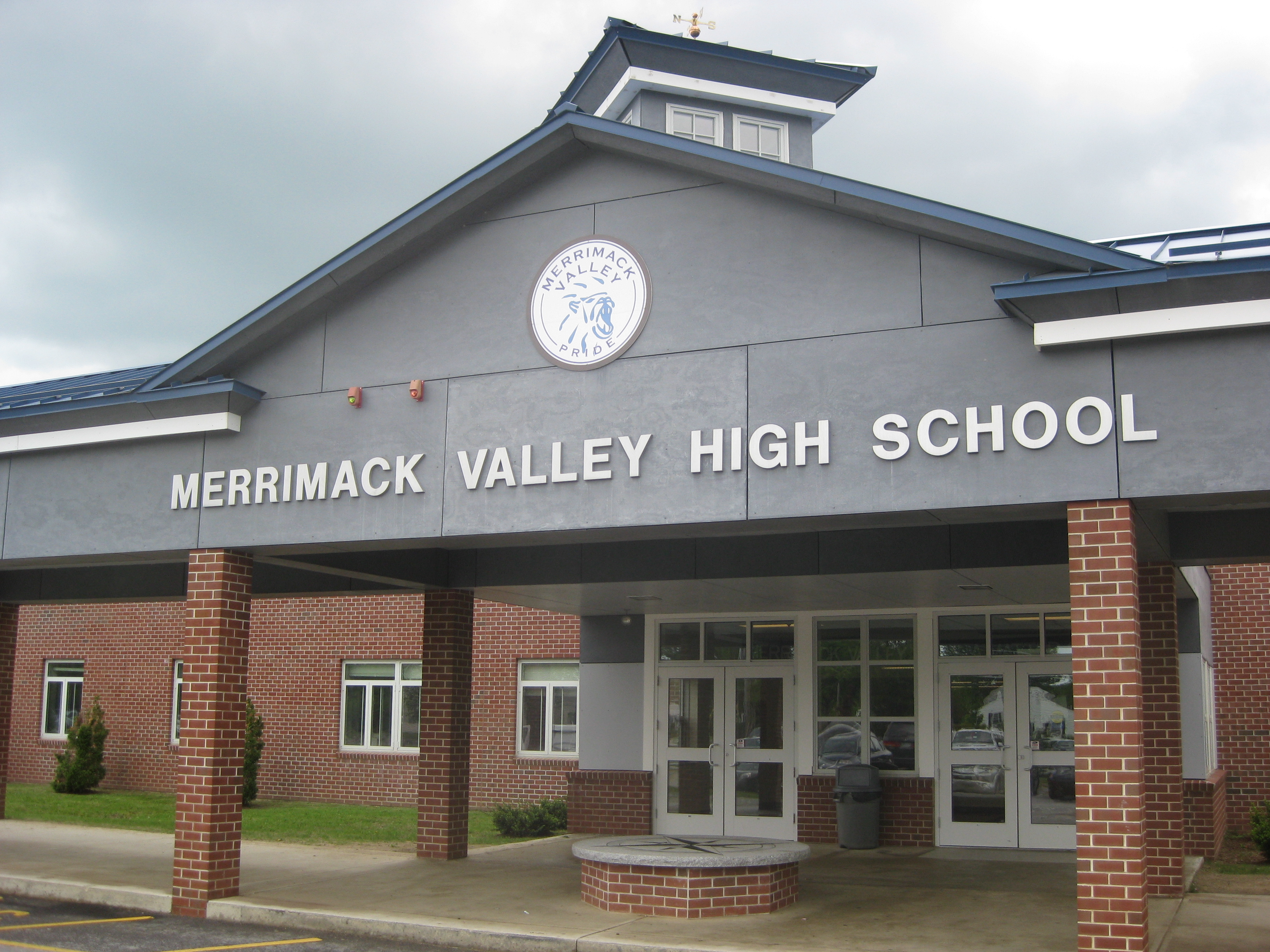
- The entrance to the school

Merrimack Valley is a four-year high school located in Penacook, a village in the northern part of Concord, New Hampshire. The school has approximately 900 students and serves the communities of Andover, Boscawen, Loudon, Penacook, Salisbury, Webster and a minor amount of students from concord. Two years of construction and remodeling were completed in 2007, resulting in a completely new facility.

The school was initially accredited by the New England Association of School and Colleges (NEASC) in 1967. The faculty, staff, students, and community began self-study for reaccreditation in 2009; the next visiting team came in 2011. In 2003, the school was recognized by the New Hampshire Excellence in Education award (EDies) for being the best high school in the state of New Hampshire.

== Advanced Placement courses ==
There are six Advanced Placement courses currently available at Merrimack Valley:

- AP Calculus AB
- AP English Literature and Composition
- AP United States History
- AP Psychology
- AP English Language and Composition
- AP Physics

In addition, the school offers several Project Running Start courses through NHTI in Concord. These courses are taught by teachers credentialed by NHTI and follow the curriculum of courses that are offered on the college campus. Students earn dual credit (both high school and college credit).

== Notable alumni ==
- Bob Tewksbury (class of 1978), former pitcher for several Major League Baseball teams, most notably the St. Louis Cardinals, current sports psychology coach for the Boston Red Sox
- Scott Drapeau (class of 1991), former basketball player at the University of New Hampshire
