= Courtney Allen Curtis =

American politician

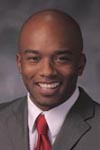

Member of the Missouri House of Representatives from the 73rd district
- In office January 9, 2013 – December 5, 2018
- Preceded by: Stacey Newman
- Succeeded by: Raychel Proudie

Personal details
- Born: April 12, 1981 (age 45) Ferguson, Missouri, US
- Party: Democratic
- Education: University of Missouri Columbia College (Missouri)
- Occupation: Politician
- Website: http://www.house.mo.gov/member.aspx?district=073

Courtney Allen Curtis (born April 12, 1981) is an American former politician who served in the Missouri House of Representatives from 2013 to 2018. He represented the 73rd District, which includes such north St. Louis County municipalities as Ferguson, Berkeley, Kinloch, Woodson Terrace, St. Ann, Cool Valley, Hazelwood, Normandy, Bridgeton, and Edmundson.

A native of Ferguson, Missouri, Curtis was a vocal figure during the unrest over the shooting of Michael Brown.

In 2018 he was sentenced to 21 months in prison for using campaign funds for personal use.

== Early life and career ==
=== Early life and education ===
Curtis was born on April 12, 1981, and raised in Florissant, Missouri, graduating from McCluer Senior High School in 1999. He attended Columbia College and University of Missouri, where he served as president of the Collegiate 100, a chapter of the 100 Black Men.

=== Career ===
A member of the Missouri Democratic Party, Curtis represents north St. Louis County (District 73) in the Missouri House of Representatives. He was elected to his first two-year term in 2012 and re-elected in 2014 and 2016. Curtis was appointed president of the Freshman Democratic Caucus and chair of the Freshman Bipartisan Issues committee. He was named Associated Students of the University of Missouri Legislator of the Year in 2013.

In April 2014, Curtis established North County Forever, a nonprofit organization dedicated to revitalization of the 73rd District.

In March 2016, Curtis introduced a controversial bill that would have designated the St. Louis Cardinals as the official Major League Baseball club of the state of Missouri.

A vocal advocate for greater inclusion of minorities in Missouri construction contracts, Curtis was involved in a physical altercation with fellow Democratic state representative Michael Butler of St. Louis after a heated exchange of words over Curtis's anti-union stance.

==== Arrest and Conviction ====
In 2017, he pled guilty to three counts of wire fraud regarding his unreported use of funds from his re-election campaign funds for which he used instead for personal expenses such as travel. He was fined over $77,000, but he did not pay them. He then resigned. (2018)

=== Ferguson unrest ===
In the wake of the events surrounding the death of Michael Brown, Curtis called for the mayor, judges, and police leadership of Ferguson to step down.

== Elections ==
=== 2012 ===
Curtis defeated Doug Clemens in the 2012 Democratic primary election and ran unopposed in the general election.

=== 2014 ===
Curtis ran unopposed in the 2014 primary and general elections.

=== 2016 ===
Curtis defeated Democratic challengers Daniel Wibracht, Eileen McGeoghegan, and Lee Smith in the 2016 primary election and ran unopposed in the general election.

== Committee assignments ==
As an incoming freshman, Curtis served on the following committees:

=== 2013–2014 ===
- Democrat Freshman Committee (president)
- Freshman Bipartisan Issue Committee
- Ways and Means Committee
- Agri-Business Committee
- International Trade Committee

=== 2015–2017 ===
Curtis was appointed chairman of the Special Committee on Urban Issues, becoming the only Democrat to chair a committee for 2015 legislative session. He also served on the following committees:

- Joint Committee on Education
- Rules Committee
- Legislative Oversight Committee
- Appropriations Committee
- Health, Mental Health, and Social Services Committee
- Ways and Means Committee
- Government Oversight and Accountability Committee
- Select Committee on Local, State, Federal Relations and Miscellaneous Business

== 2014 Bills ==
=== 2014 Sponsored Bills ===
Bill	Description	Date	Last Action
HB1619	Specifies that the aggregate amount of tuition charged by a receiving school district during a school year must not exceed $10,000 per pupil when a student transfers from an unaccredited district	04/30/2014	HCS Voted Do Pass (H)
HB1624	Designates the "high five" as the official state greeting	02/05/2014	Referred: Tourism and Natural Resources(H)
HB1625	Establishes the Missouri Indoor Clean Air Act and changes the laws regarding smoking in public places	02/05/2014	Referred: Local Government(H)
HB1694	Allows any county to establish a County Youth Initiative and authorize a sales tax to provide programs to improve children's well-being and prevent juvenile delinquency	04/08/2014	Public Hearing Completed (H)
HB1695	Authorizes a community children's services fund to expend funds to provide preventative services, including transportation costs, for children	04/08/2014	Motion to Do Pass Failed (H)
HB1696	Authorizes an income tax deduction for single residents who have never had a child	02/11/2014	Referred: Ways and Means(H)
HB1704	Establishes the Missouri Tuition Equity Act	02/18/2014	Public Hearing Completed (H)
HB1705	Allows students at two-year or four-year colleges or universities to seek tuition reimbursement for college remedial courses under certain circumstances	02/18/2014	Public Hearing Completed (H)
HB1706	Requires a student to successfully complete four units of credit in both mathematics and science to receive a high school diploma	02/11/2014	Referred: Elementary and Secondary Education(H)
HB1808	Authorizes an income tax deduction for expenses incurred in creating or forming a limited liability company or sole proprietorship	03/04/2014	Public Hearing Completed (H)
HB1809	Authorizes an income tax deduction for 100% of the tuition paid for up to the last 30 hours required to complete an associate or bachelor's degree from a public two-year or four-year college	02/25/2014	Public Hearing Completed (H)
HB1810	Designates June 1 as "Underrepresented Minority Contractor Appreciation Day" in Missouri	02/18/2014	Referred: Tourism and Natural Resources(H)
HB1811	Establishes the Committee for Entrepreneurs within the Department of Economic Development and a grant program for certain accelerated computer programming programs	03/04/2014	Public Hearing Completed (H)
HB1812	Changes the laws regarding economic development incentives	02/18/2014	Referred: Economic Development(H)
HB1813	Establishes the Missouri Youth Funds Legislative Oversight Committee to ensure that all youth funds in the state are operated efficiently and effectively	03/11/2014	Motion to Do Pass Failed (H)
HB1814	Waives the articles of organization filing fee every January for newly formed LLCs	03/12/2014	Action Postponed (H)
HB1859	Requires the minimum annual salary of legislative assistants of the House of Representatives to begin at a level 15% below the annual salary of the hiring Representative, with cost of living adjustments	03/12/2014	Public Hearing Completed (H)
HB1931	Requires the Governor to issue a proclamation for Primary Election Day and for General Municipal Election Day	02/26/2014	Referred: Elections(H)
HB1978	Requires radiation monitoring to be conducted at any solid waste disposal area located in Bridgeton	05/16/2014	Referred: Tourism and Natural Resources(H)
HB1979	Designates the first Tuesday after the first Monday in April of each year as a state holiday known as "Voter Pride and Awareness Day" or "Voter Pride Day"	03/27/2014	Public Hearing Completed (H)
HB2106	Requires commercial mobile service providers to report specified information to the Missouri Public Service Commission for posting on its website	05/16/2014	Referred: Utilities(H)
HB2165	Requires the Coordinating Board for Higher Education to conduct a study to consider a three-year bachelor's degree program in selected public higher education institutions	05/16/2014	Referred: Higher Education(H)
HB2166	Prohibits a higher education institution from charging a Missouri resident who is a full-time student a tuition rate that exceeds the amount charged when the student first enrolled for the next five years	05/16/2014	Referred: Higher Education(H)
HB2167	Requires school districts and charter schools to identify students needing remedial coursework and implement a virtual school program to assist the identified students	05/16/2014	Referred: Elementary and Secondary Education(H)
HB2170	Establishes the 8 in 6 Program within the Department of Elementary and Secondary Education	05/16/2014	Referred: Elementary and Secondary Education(H)
HB2195	Expands the Incentive Subsidy Program to encourage municipal courts to seek assistance from the Division of Youth Services in order to utilize community early intervention programs for youth	05/16/2014	Referred: Judiciary(H)
HB2196	Creates the Office of Public Counsel Fund to fund the office within the Missouri Public Service Commission from regulated utilities based on each utility's total gross intrastate operating revenues	05/16/2014	Referred: Utilities(H)
HB2211	Establishes a state Community Education Council and requires a community action council to be established in each school district located in St. Louis City and St. Louis County	05/16/2014	Referred: Urban Issues(H)
HB2228	Changes the laws regarding federal work authorization programs	05/16/2014	Referred: Workforce Development and Workplace Safety(H)
HB2291	Establishes the Historic Revitalization Act	05/16/2014	Referred: Economic Development(H)
HB2299	Requires any county that contains an unaccredited school district to devote 10% of its annual revenue to a grant program to deliver services to the school district	05/16/2014	Referred: Elementary and Secondary Education(H)

=== 2014 Co-Sponsored Bills ===
HB1068*	Allows certain felons to be eligible for federal food stamp program benefits	01/16/2014	Referred: Government Oversight and Accountability(H)
HB1134*	Specifies that in all criminal cases a $5 surcharge must be assessed as costs with specified exceptions to be credited to the Brain Injury Fund	01/09/2014	Referred: Judiciary(H)
HB1151*	Allows misdemeanor offenses for stealing to be expunged	01/16/2014	Referred: Judiciary(H)
HB1152*	Creates the offense of distribution of a controlled substance near a child care facility	04/24/2014	Rules - Reported Do Pass (H)
HB1153*	Prohibits an employer from using a job applicant's personal credit history as a hiring criteria except where the credit history is shown to be directly related to the position sought by the applicant	04/03/2014	HCS#2 Reported Do Pass (H)
HB1317*	Changes the time for a man to file an action to establish paternity or file with the putative father registry from 15 days to 60 days after the birth of the child	01/16/2014	Referred: Judiciary(H)
HB1321*	Changes the time for consent for adoption to be executed from 48 hours to 72 hours after the birth of a child	02/11/2014	Reported Do Not Pass (H)
HB1322*	Allows a person convicted of a drug-related felony to become eligible for Supplemental Nutrition Assistance Program benefits upon meeting certain conditions	01/16/2014	Referred: General Laws(H)
HB1323*	Authorizes expungement for specified offenses and increases the surcharge on petitions for expungement from $100 to $500	01/16/2014	Referred: Judiciary(H)
HB1441*	Requires each session of the General Assembly to be broadcast on the Internet via audio and video live streaming	01/28/2014	Referred: General Laws(H)
HB1442*	Designates December 4 as "Alpha Phi Alpha Day" in Missouri in honor of the first black intercollegiate Greek-letter fraternity established for African-Americans	03/27/2014	Second read and referred: Senate General Laws(S)
HB1604*	Allows any registered voter who is eligible to vote in a particular election to do so by absentee ballot without being required to state a reason	04/07/2014	Public Hearing Completed (H)
HB1747*	Allows community service in lieu of a fine for certain traffic offenses	02/12/2014	Referred: Judiciary(H)
HB1764*	Prohibits publishing of the names of lottery winners without written consent	02/12/2014	Referred: General Laws(H)
HB1820*	Changes the laws regarding bullying in schools	02/18/2014	Referred: Elementary and Secondary Education(H)
HB1858*	Changes the laws regarding complaints filed with the Missouri Commission on Human Rights regarding discrimination based upon a person's sexual orientation or gender identity	02/25/2014	Referred: Judiciary(H)
HB1907*	Limits the rate of tuition that a receiving school district can charge when receiving students from unaccredited districts	04/30/2014	Voted Do Pass (H)
HB1924*	Authorizes a sales tax exemption for products that are made in the USA during the sales tax holiday in July with specified exceptions	04/08/2014	Public Hearing Completed (H)
HB1981*	Authorizes the board of aldermen of fourth class cities to enact certain types of ordinances regulating residential rental property	03/04/2014	Referred: Local Government(H)
HB1989*	Changes the laws regarding the Missouri individual income tax	03/04/2014	Referred: Ways and Means(H)
HB1991*	Changes the laws regarding eligibility for MO HealthNet benefits	05/16/2014	Referred: Health Care Policy(H)
HB2028*	Designates the month of November each year as "Epilepsy Awareness Month"	05/07/2014	Placed on Informal Calendar
HB2038*	Creates a tax credit for an employer that hires a student majoring in the field of science, technology, engineering, or mathematics for an internship	04/28/2014	Rules - Reported Do Pass (H)
HB2040*	Allows a qualified first responder to administer naloxone to a person suffering from an apparent narcotic or opiate-related overdose	07/07/2014	Approved by Governor (G)
HB2086*	Expands income eligibility under the MO HealthNet Program to 138% of the federal poverty level and changes various provisions regarding the delivery of health care to improve health care outcomes	05/16/2014	Referred: Government Oversight and Accountability(H)
HB2096*	Changes the laws regarding the licensing of child care facilities	05/16/2014	Referred: Children, Families, and Persons with Disabilities(H)
HB2097*	Establishes Nathan's Law that changes the laws regarding the licensing of child care facilities	05/16/2014	Referred: Children, Families, and Persons with Disabilities(H)
HB2134*	Repeals the authority of a school district board to retain counsel and requires the Attorney General to furnish whatever legal services are necessary to exercise its powers upon the request of the board	03/26/2014	Referred: Elementary and Secondary Education(H)
HB2156*	Requires the Department of Higher Education to develop a program to offer information technology certification through technical course work	04/08/2014	Voted Do Pass (H)
HB2162*	Establishes the 2014 Safe Patient Handling and Movement Act	05/16/2014	Referred: Health Care Policy(H)
HB2254*	Changes the laws regarding sales and use tax exemptions for agricultural seed, feed, and pesticides	05/16/2014	Referred: Agriculture Policy(H)
HCR3*	Requests the United States Congress to transfer authority for the remediation of the West Lake Landfill radioactive wastes from the EPA to the Corps of Engineers Formerly Utilized Sites Remedial Action Program	05/16/2014	Referred: General Laws(H)
HCR39*	Establishes Missouri's ratification of the Equal Rights Amendment to the United States Constitution	05/16/2014	Referred: Judiciary(H)
HJR85*	Proposes a constitutional amendment allowing the state to recognize a marriage between a man and a woman as well as between a same-sex couple	05/16/2014	Referred: Judiciary(H)
HB1113*	Allows a person 60 years of age or older to renew a nondriver's identification without being physically present at the license bureau under specified conditions	05/06/2014	Voted Do Pass (H)
HB1112*	Establishes the End Racial Profiling Act of 2014	01/16/2014	Referred: General Laws(H)
HB1380*	Removes the words "mental retardation" and "mentally retarded" from the statutes, except for references to a clinical diagnosis	04/24/2014	Public Hearing Scheduled (S)
HB1381*	Establishes the Joint Committee on Children's Services Oversight to review laws and policies, study problems, develop a comprehensive policy, and review contracted services	05/01/2014	Action Postponed (H)
HB1382*	Authorizes expungement of juvenile records of persons adjudicated as delinquent in certain circumstances	01/28/2014	Referred: Judiciary(H)
HB1383*	Grants in-state tuition eligibility for active duty military personnel and national guard	01/28/2014	Referred: Higher Education(H)
HB1384*	Requires the General Assembly to provide live video and audio broadcasting of all legislative sessions of its chamber to the public	01/28/2014	Referred: General Laws(H)
HB1431*	Establishes state offenses for acts against officers of the state which are similar to federal offenses for acts against federal officers	01/22/2014	Referred: Crime Prevention and Public Safety(H)
HCR10*	Commemorates the twenty-second anniversary of the Khojaly Tragedy in Azerbaijan	02/12/2014	Public Hearing Completed (H)

== 2015 Sponsored Bills ==
Bill	Description	Date	Last Action
HB729	Requires a runoff election for county executive, prosecuting attorney, and county assessor in St. Louis County if no candidate receives at least 50% of the votes cast	05/15/2015	Referred: Elections
HB898	Designates June 1 as "Underrepresented Minority Contractor Appreciation Day" in Missouri	05/15/2015	Referred: Trade and Tourism
HB899	Requires the Governor to issue an executive order to implement the remedies recommended in the 2014 Disparity Study regarding utilization levels of minorities and women-based enterprises in state awarded contracts	05/15/2015	Referred: Special Committee on Urban Issues
HB900	Changes the laws regarding economic development incentives	05/15/2015	Referred: Economic Development and Business Attraction and Retention
HB901	Requires the Department of Economic Development to create a job training program for individuals with low to moderate income to help them find employment on state-funded projects	03/31/2015	Referred: Economic Development and Business Attraction and Retention
HB902	Requires school districts and charter schools to identify students needing remedial coursework and implement a virtual school program to assist the identified students	05/15/2015	Referred: Elementary and Secondary Education
HB903	Establishes the Committee for Entrepreneurs within the Department of Economic Development and a grant program for certain accelerated computer programming programs	5/15/2015	Referred: Economic Development and Business Attraction and Retention
HB904	Establishes the 8 in 6 Program within the Department of Elementary and Secondary Education	5/15/2015	Referred: Elementary and Secondary Education
HB905	Prohibits a higher education institution from charging a Missouri resident who is a full-time student a tuition rate that exceeds the amount charged when the student first enrolled for the next five years	4/21/2015	Public Hearing Completed (H)
HB906	Requires any county that contains an unaccredited school district to devote 10% of its annual revenue to a grant program to deliver services to the school district	5/15/2015	Referred: Elementary and Secondary Education
HB907	Requires courts to sentence defendants to community service for certain offenses	5/15/2015	Referred: Civil and Criminal Proceedings
HB908	Expands the Incentive Subsidy Program to encourage municipal and juvenile courts to seek assistance from the Division of Youth Services in order to utilize community early intervention programs for youth	5/15/2015	Referred: Civil and Criminal Proceedings
HB909	Establishes the Missouri Youth Funds Legislative Oversight Committee to ensure that all youth funds in the state are operated efficiently and effectively	5/15/2015	Referred: Economic Development and Business Attraction and Retention
HB944	Creates and modifies provisions relating to prosecuting attorneys	5/15/2015	Referred: Civil and Criminal Proceedings
HB945	Modifies provisions related to law enforcement officers	5/15/2015	Referred: Public Safety and Emergency Preparedness
HB1059	Creates a funding source for grants and programs that benefit children and establishes provisions to ensure youth funds in the state are operated efficiently and effectively	5/15/2015	Referred: Children and Families
HB1140	Modifies provisions relating to officers of the court	5/15/2015	Referred: Civil and Criminal Proceedings
HB1141	Allows an arrest record to be eligible for expungement if the DOJ or US Attorney General issues a report with findings that a law enforcement agency engaged in unconstitutional practices or racial profiling	5/15/2015	Referred: Public Safety and Emergency Preparedness
HB1320	Enacts provisions relating to youth opportunities	5/15/2015	Referred: Special Committee on Urban Issues
HB1321	Allows the Missouri Highway Patrol or other accredited police department to take over operations of a police department that failed to follow recommendations provided by the DOJ or US AG in a report	4/13/2015	Public Hearing Completed (H)
HB1322	Establishes the Joint Committee on Police Department Oversight	4/13/2015	Public Hearing Completed (H)
HB1349	Prohibits the executive branch from extending existing bonds or issuing new bonds without legislative or voter approval	5/15/2015	Referred: Government Oversight and Accountability
HB1363	Establishes the Missouri Youth funds legislative oversight committee	5/15/2015	Referred: Special Committee on Urban Issues
HB1364	Authorizes a community children's services fund to expend funds to provide preventative services, including transportation costs, for children	5/15/2015	Referred: Special Committee on Urban Issues
HCR41	Specifies that the General Assembly agrees with the United States Department of Justice report findings as a result of an investigation conducted following the death of Michael Brown	5/15/2015	Referred: Government Oversight and Accountability
HB582	Prohibits certain employers from requiring certain persons to become members of a labor organization as a condition or continuation of employment	2/11/2015	Perfected (H)

== 2016 Sponsored Bills ==
Bill	Description	Date	Last Action
HB2170	Modifies provisions of law relating to labor organizations	5/13/2016	Referred: Workforce Standards Development (H)
HB2171	Requires state certification of minority business enterprises and establishes a job training program for persons of low and moderate income	3/16/2016	Referred: Workforce Standards and Development (H)
HB2172	Requires any project labor agreement on a stadium project not submitted to a public vote to be entered into by the governing body of the political subdivision in which the project	5/13/2016	Referred: Workforce Standards and Development
HB2173	Changes the laws regarding earnings taxes to exempt certain taxpayers if public funds are used for a convention center or stadium without voter approval	5/13/2016	Referred: Ways and Means
HB2174	Modifies provisions relating to law enforcement officers and arrest records	4/12/2016	Referred: Public Safety and Emergency Preparedness
HB2175	Requires a runoff election for county executive, prosecuting attorney, and county assessor in St. Louis County if no candidate receives at least fifty percent of the votes cast and establishes cert	4/12/2016	Referred: Elections
HB2176	Contains various provisions relating to tuition rates and tax credits for students at public institutions of higher education	4/12/2016	Referred: Higher Education
HB2177	Establishes the Historic Revitalization Act	5/13/2016	Referred: Economic Development and Business Attraction and Retention
HB2189	Requires ethical reforms related to testing of elementary and secondary education students	5/13/2016	Referred: Elementary and Secondary Education
HB2206	Changes the laws regarding nonprofit hospitals	5/13/2016	Referred: Health and Mental Health Policy
HB2207	Changes the laws regarding youth	5/13/2016	Referred: Special Committee on Urban Issues
HB2276	Removes the union lobbying exemption	3/15/2016	HCS Reported Do Pass (H)
HB2277	Creates the Office of Public Counsel to fund the office within the Missouri Public Service Commission from regulated utilities based on each utility's total gross intrastate operating revenues	5/13/2016	Referred: Utility Infrastructure
HB2327	Establishes the Urban Education Institute	5/3/2016	Second read and referred: Senate Education
HB2357	Changes the laws regarding certain Children's Services Funds	4/18/2016	Public Hearing Completed (H)
HB2392	Establishes the Labor Organization Minority Discrimination Interim Committee	4/4/2016	Public Hearing Completed (H)
HB2408	Requires voter approval for political subdivision expenditures on public works projects projected to cost more than twenty million dollars	5/13/2016	Referred: Local Government
HB2409	Consolidates all the school districts in St. Louis County	5/13/2016	Referred: Local Government
HB2410	Requires all fire protection districts and municipal fire departments in St. Louis County to consolidate into one fire district upon the approval of the voters in the county	5/13/2016	Referred: Local Government
HB2630	Establishes a job training program for persons of low and moderate income	5/11/2016	Reported Do Pass (H)
HB2640	Prohibits a community children's services fund from transferring any funds to the state or certain cities	5/13/2016	Referred: Children and Families
HB2641	Allows Children's Services Funds to be used to fund juvenile delinquency prevention programs	3/3/2016	Referred: Children and Families
HB2642	Designates Lincoln University as Missouri's flagship institution	5/13/2016	Referred: Children and Families
HB2649	Authorizes the Department of Natural Resources to acquire certain property in Kinloch, Missouri for the establishment of a state park	5/13/2016	Referred: Conservation and Natural Resources
HB2740	Establishes a Joint Committee On University of Missouri System Accountability"	5/13/2016	Referred: Higher Education
HB2798	Requires law enforcement officers employed in St. Louis County to reside in St. Louis County	5/13/2016	Referred: Public Safety and Emergency Preparedness
HB2799	Requires employees of St. Louis County to reside within St. Louis County.	5/13/2016	Referred: Local Government
HB2829	Establishes the "Municipalities Financial Recovery Act"	5/13/2016	Referred: Local Government
HB2830	Authorizes an earnings tax for St. Louis County	5/13/2016	Referred: Ways and Means
HB2831	Designates the St. Louis Cardinals as the official baseball team of Missouri	5/13/2016	Referred: Trade and Tourism
HCR80	Disapproves of Barnes-Jewish Hospital moving out of certain neighborhoods in St. Louis	5/13/2016	Referred: Trade Tourism
HCR83	Urges the department of elementary and secondary education to promote a culture in which educators feel free to discuss issues and work together to achieve a quality education for each student	4/4/2016	Public Hearing Completed (H)
HCR95	Urges the City of St. Louis to develop a strategy to wean itself off the earnings tax and a plan to invest in North City	5/13/2016	Referred: Special Committee on Urban Issues
HCR105	Designates Lincoln University as Missouri's flagship institution	5/13/2016	Referred: Higher Education
HJR87	Proposes a constitutional amendment removing prohibitions related to school district boundaries and affairs	5/13/2016	Referred: Higher Education
HB1605*	Authorizes an earned income tax credit in Missouri	5/12/2016	Second read and referred: Senate Ways and Means
HB1801*	Prohibits an employer from requiring an employee or prospective employee to consent to a request for a credit report unless the employer is a financial institution or the report is required by law	3/10/2016	Reported Do Pass (H)
HB2625*	Allows for the use of medical marijuana to treat serious conditions	5/13/2016	Referred: Emerging Issues
HCR74*	Urges the United States government to condemn the persecution of Falun Gong practitioners	4/27/2016	Referred: Government Oversight and Accountability

== 2017 Sponsored Bills ==
Bill	Description	Date	Last Action
HB615	Authorizes the Department of Natural Resources to acquire certain property in Kinloch, Missouri for the establishment of a state park	4/3/2017	Motion to Do Pass Failed (H)
HB616	Establishes the Urban Education Institute	4/13/2017	Referred: Rules - Legislative Oversight
HB617	Allows children's services funds to be used to fund juvenile delinquency prevention programs	2/7/2017	Referred: Rules - Legislative Oversight
HB618	Prohibits a community children's services fund from transferring any funds to the state or certain cities	4/13/2017	Referred: Rules - Legislative Oversight
HB673	Establishes safeguards concerning discriminatory practices against persons who have been convicted of certain offenses	3/8/2017	Referred: Judiciary
HB699	Requires the court to disclose certain consequences prior to accepting a guilty plea	4/18/2017	Public Hearing Completed (H)
HB1166	Changes the law regarding the right of suffrage for former felons	5/12/2017	Referred: Select Committee on Local, State, Federal Relations and Miscellaneous Business
HB1195	Requires certain air pollution sources that emit mercury to pay an annual fee	5/12/2017	Referred: Select Committee on Local, State, Federal Relations and Miscellaneous Business
HCR19*	Authorizes the issuance of public bonds for half of the financing of a new conservatory building at UMKC	5/22/2017	Delivered to Governor

*= Co-Sponsored Bills
