= Gerry Friel =

American basketball coach (1943–2007)

Biographical details
- Born: July 8, 1943; Utica, New York, U.S.
- Died: August 20, 2007 (aged 64); Durham, New Hampshire, U.S.
- Education: Oswego State

Coaching career (HC unless noted)
- 1965–1966: Fulton HS
- 1966–1969: Boston College (assistant)
- 1969–1989: New Hampshire

Head coaching record
- Overall: 189–335 (.361)

Accomplishments and honors

Awards
- ECAC North Coach of the Year (1983)

Gerard Friel (July 8, 1943 – August 20, 2007) was an American college basketball coach, known for his 20-year tenure at New Hampshire where he is the school's all-time winningest coach.

After graduating from Oswego State in 1965, Friel began his coaching career in upstate New York at Fulton High School for a season, until he joined Bob Cousy's staff as an assistant coach at Boston College. During his time with the Eagles, the team advanced to the NCAA Tournament in 1967 and 1968, along with the NIT championship game in 1969.

Friel was named the head coach of New Hampshire in 1969, and coached for 20 years until his retirement in 1989. During the 1973–74 and 1982-83 season, Friel guided the Wildcats to a 16 wins, which was the most wins in school history until the 2013-14 season. For his coaching efforts during the 1982-83 season, UNH shared the ECAC North regular season title, and Friel was named ECAC North Coach of the Year, along with the U.S. Basketball Writers Association All-District Coach of the Year.

After his retirement from coaching, Friel embarked on an administrative career in the UNH athletic department as both Director of University Athletic Relations, and Director of Athletic Fundraising, along with serving as Vice President of the UNH Foundation.

Friel died on August 20, 2007, after a long battle with illness.

== Head coaching record ==
Record table
Season	Team	Overall	Conference	Standing	Postseason
New Hampshire Wildcats (Yankee Conference/Independent/America East Conference) (1969–1989)
1969–70	New Hampshire	12–11	3–7	T–4th	
1970–71	New Hampshire	11–12	3–7	T–4th	
1971–72	New Hampshire	14–9	5–5	T–4th	
1972–73	New Hampshire	11–15	2–10	T–6th	
1973–74	New Hampshire	16–9	8–4	3rd	
1974–75	New Hampshire	6–18	2–10	6th	
1975–76	New Hampshire	8–18	3–9	6th	
1976–77	New Hampshire	12–14	N/A	N/A	
1977–78	New Hampshire	7–19	N/A	N/A	
1978–79	New Hampshire	10–16	N/A	N/A	
1979–80	New Hampshire	4–22	0–11	10th	
1980–81	New Hampshire	7–19	3–7	9th	
1981–82	New Hampshire	9–18	2–9	9th	
1982–83	New Hampshire	16–12	8–2	2nd	
1983–84	New Hampshire	15–13	8–6	4th	
1984–85	New Hampshire	7–22	4–12	8th	
1985–86	New Hampshire	11–17	5–13	7th	
1986–87	New Hampshire	4–24	3–15	9th	
1987–88	New Hampshire	4–25	3–15	8th	
1988–89	New Hampshire	4–22	3–14	10th	
New Hampshire:		188–335 (.359)	65–156 (.202)		
Total:		188–335 (.359)			
National champion Postseason invitational champion Conference regular season champion Conference regular season and conference tournament champion Division regular season champion Division regular season and conference tournament champion Conference tournament champion
