= George Blaney =

American basketball player and coach

Personal information
- Born: November 12, 1939 (age 87) Jersey City, New Jersey, U.S.
- Listed height: 6 ft 1 in (1.85 m)
- Listed weight: 175 lb (79 kg)

Career information
- High school: St. Peter's Prep (Jersey City, New Jersey)
- College: Holy Cross (1958–1961)
- NBA draft: 1961: 4th round, 33rd overall pick
- Drafted by: New York Knicks
- Playing career: 1961–1967
- Position: Point guard
- Number: 15

Career history

Playing
- 1961–1962: New York Knicks
- 1962–1964: Trenton Colonials
- 1964–1966: Camden Bullets
- 1966–1967: Allentown Jets

Coaching
- 1967–1969: Stonehill
- 1969–1972: Dartmouth
- 1972–1994: Holy Cross
- 1994–1997: Seton Hall
- 2000–2013: Connecticut (assistant)

Career highlights
- All-EPBL Second Team (1964)

Career NBA statistics
- Points: 117 (3.3 ppg)
- Rebounds: 36 (1.0 rpg)
- Assists: 45 (1.3 apg)
- Stats at NBA.com
- Stats at Basketball Reference

George R. Blaney (born November 12, 1939) is an American former basketball player and coach.

Blaney played high school basketball at St. Peter's Preparatory School in Jersey City.

After playing basketball at the College of the Holy Cross during the late 1950s and early 1960s, the 6'1" Blaney spent one season with the New York Knicks of the National Basketball Association.

Blaney played in the Eastern Professional Basketball League (EPBL) for the Trenton Colonials, Camden Bullets and Allentown Jets from 1962 to 1967. He was selected to the All-EPBL Second Team in 1964.

He served as the head basketball coach at Stonehill College from 1967 to 1969 and Dartmouth College from 1969 to 1971. From 1972 to 1994, he served as head coach of Holy Cross, compiling a 357–276 overall record. He then became head coach at Seton Hall University, where he led the team to the NIT twice before being fired following the 1996–97 season.

In 2000, he began serving as an assistant head coach at the University of Connecticut. Blaney, while filling in for Jim Calhoun, made history at UConn on January 23, 2010, when UConn defeated the top–ranked Texas Longhorns, 88–74. It marked the first time that an opponent had come to Gampel Pavilion ranked first in the nation, and was subsequently the first time UConn ousted the nation's top team at home.

Blaney also filled in for Calhoun for 11 games in the 2011–12 season. He is credited with the first three games of the 2011–12 Big East Conference season, when Calhoun sat out a conference-imposed suspension for recruiting violations. He also served as interim coach throughout February 2012, when Calhoun went on medical leave; those eight games, however, are credited to Calhoun.

Blaney announced his retirement on June 13, 2013.

== Career statistics ==
Legend
GP	Games played	GS	Games started	MPG	Minutes per game
FG%	Field goal percentage	3P%	3-point field goal percentage	FT%	Free throw percentage
RPG	Rebounds per game	APG	Assists per game	SPG	Steals per game
BPG	Blocks per game	PPG	Points per game	**Bold**	Career high

=== NBA ===
==== Regular season ====
Year	Team	GP	MPG	FG%	FT%	RPG	APG	PPG
1961–62	New York	36	10.1	.380	.529	1.0	1.3	3.3
