= New Hampshire Wildcats men's basketball =

2026–27 New Hampshire Wildcats men's basketball team
- University: University of New Hampshire
- Head coach: Nathan Davis (4th season)
- Location: Durham, New Hampshire
- Arena: Lundholm Gym (capacity: 3,500)
- Conference: America East
- Nickname: Wildcats
- Colors: Blue, gray, and white

Conference regular-season champions
- 1983

Uniforms
Home	Away	Alternate

The New Hampshire Wildcats Basketball team is the basketball team that represent the University of New Hampshire in Durham, New Hampshire. The school's team currently competes in the America East Conference and plays its home games at Lundholm Gym. They are one of just two schools in the state of New Hampshire to compete in NCAA Division I for basketball. The Wildcats are one of 45 Division I programs to have never appeared in the NCAA Division I men's basketball tournament. They are currently coached by Nathan Davis. They have never sent a player into the National Basketball Association.

== Team history ==
=== Awards ===
America East Player of the Year

- Scott Drapeau – 1994
- Clarence Daniels – 2024

America East Coach of the Year

- Gerry Friel – 1983

America East Rookie of the Year

- Al McLain – 1981
- Pat Manor – 1990
- Tanner Leissner – 2015

All-Conference First Team

- Robin Dixon – 1983
- Al McLain – 1984
- Scott Drapeau – 1994, 1995
- Chris Brown – 2002
- Blagov Janev – 2006
- Tanner Leissner – 2015
- Clarence Daniels – 2024

All-Conference Second Team

- Dan Nolan – 1984
- Dirk Koopman – 1986
- James Ben – 1992
- Eric Montanari – 1994
- Matt Alosa – 1995, 1996
- Austin Ganly – 2002
- Ben Sturgill – 2005
- Blagov Janev – 2007
- Tyrece Gibbs – 2009
- Alvin Abreu – 2010

All-Conference Third Team

- Jermaine Anderson – 2007
- Tyrece Gibbs – 2008
- Ahmad Robinson – 2024
- Sami Pissis - 2025

All-Conference Defensive Team

- Jermaine Anderson – 2007

== Coaches ==
Years	Coach	Win	Loss	Win %	Conference Titles	NCAA Tournament Appearances	NCAA Title
1907–1908	Alexander Gion	8	3	.727	-	-	-
1910–1911	Ray B. Thomas	6	3	.667	-	-	-
1911–1912	Percy Reynolds	7	4	.583	-	-	-
1912–1913	Tod Eberle	5	5	.500	-	-	-
1915–1916	Carl Reed	6	7	.461	-	-	-
1916–1928	Butch Cowell	119	54	.688	-	-	-
1928–1938; 1939–1943; 1945–1946	Henry Swasey	108	128	.458	-	-	-
1938–1939	George Sauer	3	14	.176	-	-	-
1946–1950	Ed Stanczyk	22	44	.333	-	-	-
1950–1951	Andy Mooradian	4	12	.250	-	-	-
1951–1952	Dale Hall	11	9	.550	-	-	-
1952–1956	Bob Kerr	22	49	.310	-	-	-
1956–1966	Bill Olson	60	146	.291	-	-	-
1966–1969	Bill Haubrich	20	49	.290	-	-	-
1969–1989	Gerry Friel	189	335	.361	-	-	-
1989–1992	Jim Boylan	15	69	.189	-	-	-
1992–1996	Gib Chapman	46	64	.418	-	-	-
1996–1999	Jeff Jackson	21	60	.259	-	-	-
1999–2005	Phil Rowe	45	125	.265	-	-	-
2005–2023	Bill Herrion	227	303	.428	-	-	-

== Season-by-season results ==
1900s
Season	Head coach	Conf.	Overall	Conference tournament	Postseason
1902–03	No Coach		4–4		
1903–04	No Coach		3–3		
1904–05	No Coach		6–4		
1905–06	No Coach		3–4		
1904–05	No Coach		3–6		
1906–07	No Coach		7–4		
1907–08	Alexander Gion		8–3		
1908–09	No Coach		6–5		
1909–10	No Coach		5–3		

1910s
Season	Head coach	Conf.	Overall	Conference tournament	Postseason
1910–11	Ray B. Thomas		6–3		
1911–12	Percy Reynolds		7–4		
1912–13	Tod Eberle		5–5		
1914–15	No Coach		4–11		
1915–16	Carl Reed		6–7		
1916–17	Butch Cowell		7–6		
1917–18	Butch Cowell		7–3		
1918–19	Butch Cowell		11–3		
1919–20	Butch Cowell		9–6		

1920s
Season	Head coach	Conf.	Overall	Conference tournament	Postseason
1920–21	Butch Cowell		12–5		
1921–22	Butch Cowell		10–8		
1922–23	Butch Cowell		10–5		
1923–24	Butch Cowell		12–2		
1924–25	Butch Cowell		11–3		
1925–26	Butch Cowell		11–4		
1926–27	Butch Cowell		14–1		
1927–28	Butch Cowell		5–8		
1928–29	Henry Swasey		10–4		
1929–30	Henry Swasey		8–6		

1930s
Season	Head coach	Conf.	Overall	Conference tournament	Postseason
1930–31	Henry Swasey		8–8		
1931–32	Henry Swasey		9–5		
1932–33	Henry Swasey		10–5		
1933–34	Henry Swasey		6–7		
1934–35	Henry Swasey		11–3		
1935–36	Henry Swasey		7–8		
1936–37	Henry Swasey		3–12		
Yankee Conference (1937–1976)
1937–38	Henry Swasey	4–4	11–6		
1938–39	George Sauer	0–8	3–14		
1939–40	Henry Swasey	3–5	5–10		

1940s
Season	Head coach	Conf.	Overall	Conference tournament	Postseason
1940–41	Henry Swasey	3–5	9–8		
1941–42	Henry Swasey	0–8	4–15		
1942–43	Henry Swasey	2–6	4–14		
1945–46	Henry Swasey	0–4	3–7		
1946–47	Ed Stanczyk	0–5	6–11		
1947–48	Ed Stanczyk	2–5	5–12		
1948–49	Ed Stanczyk	2–6	7–10		
1949–50	Ed Stanczyk	1–5	4–11		

1950s
Season	Head coach	Conf.	Overall	Conference tournament	Postseason
1950–51	Andy Mooradian	0–6	4–12		
1951–52	Dale Hall	4–5	11–9		
1952–53	Bob Kerr	2–5	8–10		
1953–54	Bob Kerr	2–6	8–10		
1954–55	Bob Kerr	1–9	4–14		
1955–56	Bob Kerr	0–10	2–15		
1956–57	Bill Olson	1–9	3–16		
1957–58	Bill Olson	3–7	10–12		
1958–59	Bill Olson	1–9	9–14		
1959–60	Bill Olson	2–8	9–14		

1960s
Season	Head coach	Conf.	Overall	Conference tournament	Postseason
1960–61	Bill Olson	1–9	6–18		
1961–62	Bill Olson	1–9	3–20		
1962–63	Bill Olson	2–8	7–17		
1963–64	Bill Olson	2–8	8–15		
1964–65	Bill Olson	1–9	2–19		
1965–66	Bill Olson	0–10	3–21		
1966–67	Bill Haubrich	4–6	10–12		
1967–68	Bill Haubrich	0–10	1–22		
1968–69	Bill Haubrich	3–7	9–15		
1969–70	Gerry Friel	3–7	12–11		

1970s
Season	Head coach	Conf.	Overall	Conference tournament	Postseason
1970–71	Gerry Friel	3–7	11–12		
1971–72	Gerry Friel	5–5	11–9		
1972–73	Gerry Friel	2–10	11–15		
1973–74	Gerry Friel	8–4	16–9		
1974–75	Gerry Friel	2–10	6–18		
1975–76	Gerry Friel	3–9	8–18		
1976–77	Gerry Friel		12–14		
1977–78	Gerry Friel		7–19		
1978–79	Gerry Friel		10–16		
1979–80	Gerry Friel		4–22		

1980s
Season	Head coach	Conf.	Overall	Conference tournament	Postseason
America East Conference (1980–Present)
1980–81	Gerry Friel	3–7	7–19		
1981–82	Gerry Friel	2–9	9–18	America East quarterfinal (L Niagara 105–87)	
1982–83	Gerry Friel	8–2	16–12	America East semifinal (W Canisius 75–64) (L Holy Cross 89–77)	
1983–84	Gerry Friel	8–6	15–13	America East quarterfinal (L Maine 80–76)	
1984–85	Gerry Friel	4–12	7–22	America East quarterfinal (W Colgate 53–47) (L Canisius 90–56)	
1985–86	Gerry Friel	5–13	11–17	America East quarterfinal (L Boston University 69–51)	
1986–87	Gerry Friel	3–15	4–24	America East quarterfinal (L Northeastern 85–71)	
1987–88	Gerry Friel	3–15	4–25	America East semifinal (W Siena 70–63) (L Niagara 62–59)	
1988–89	Gerry Friel	3–14	4–22		
1989–90	Jim Boylan	3–9	5–23	America East quarterfinal (L Boston University 63–56)	

1990s
Season	Head coach	Conf.	Overall	Conference tournament	Postseason
1990–91	Jim Boylan	0–10	3–25	America East quarterfinal (L Boston University 88–57)	
1991–92	Jim Boylan	5–9	7–21	America East semifinal (L Drexel 78–72)	
1992–93	Gib Champman	4–10	6–21	America East quarterfinal (L Delaware 70–65)	
1993–94	Gib Champman	8–6	15–13	America East semifinal (W Delaware 80–67) (L Drexel 85–75)	
1994–95	Gib Champman	11–5	19–9	America East semifinal (W Delaware 83–81) (L Northeastern 91–70)	
1995–96	Gib Champman	5–13	6–21	America East first round (L Hartford 76–73)	
1996–97	Jeff Jackson	5–13	7–20	America East first round (L Maine 76–47)	
1997–98	Jeff Jackson	6–12	10–17	America East first round (L Towson 67–65)	
1998–99	Jeff Jackson	2–16	4–23	America East first round (L Northeastern 77–69)	
1999–2000	Phil Rowe	2–16	3–25	America East first round (L Hartford 117–88)	

2000s
Season	Head coach	Conf.	Overall	Conference tournament	Postseason
2000–01	Phil Rowe	6–12	7–21	America East first round (L Vermont 78–72)	
2001–02	Phil Rowe	8–8	11–17	America East quarterfinal (L Maine 54–48)	
2002–03	Phil Rowe	3–13	5–23	America East first round (L Boston University 75–61)	
2003–04	Phil Rowe	5–13	10–20	America East quarterfinal (W Albany 43–38) (L Vermont 58–50)	
2004–05	Phil Rowe	5–13	9–19	America East first round (L UMBC 78–73)	
2005–06	Bill Herrion	8–8	12–17	America East semifinal (W Hartford 66–62) (L Albany 67–54)	
2006–07	Bill Herrion	6–10	10–20	America East quarterfinal (L Albany 64–47)	
2007–08	Bill Herrion	6–10	9–20	America East quarterfinal (L Hartford 68–65)	
2008–09	Bill Herrion	8–8	14–16	America East semifinal (W Stony Brook 76–73) (L Binghamton 72–67)	
2009–10	Bill Herrion	6–10	13–17	America East semifinal (W Maine 68–57) (L Vermont 57–38)	

2010s
Season	Head coach	Conf.	Overall	Conference tournament	Postseason
2010–11	Bill Herrion	6–10	12–18	America East quarterfinal (L Boston 59–50)	
2011–12	Bill Herrion	7–9	13–16	America East quarterfinal (L Albany 63–45)	
2012–13	Bill Herrion	5–11	9–20	America East quarterfinal (L Vermont 61–42)	
2013–14	Bill Herrion	4–12	6–24	America East quarterfinal (L Vermont 77–60)	
2014–15	Bill Herrion	11–5	19–13	America East quarterfinal (L Albany 60–58)	CIT first round (L NJIT 84–77)
2015–16	Bill Herrion	11–5	20–13	America East semifinal (W Binghamton 56–51) (L Vermont 63–56)	CIT second round (W Fairfield 77–62) (L Coastal Carolina 71–62)
2016–17	Bill Herrion	10–6	20–12	America East semifinal (W UMBC 74–65) (L Vermont 74–41)	

All-Time Conference Record: 278–648 (.300)
All-Time Overall Record: 911–1310 (.410)

== Postseason ==
=== CIT results ===
New Hampshire has appeared in the CollegeInsider.com Postseason Tournament (CIT) twice. The Wildcats have a record of 1–2.

Year	Round	Opponent	Result
2015	First Round	NJIT	L 77–84
2016	First Round; Second Round	Fairfield; Coastal Carolina	W 77–62; L 62–71
