= Penacook, New Hampshire =

Unincorporated community in New Hampshire, United States

- Village
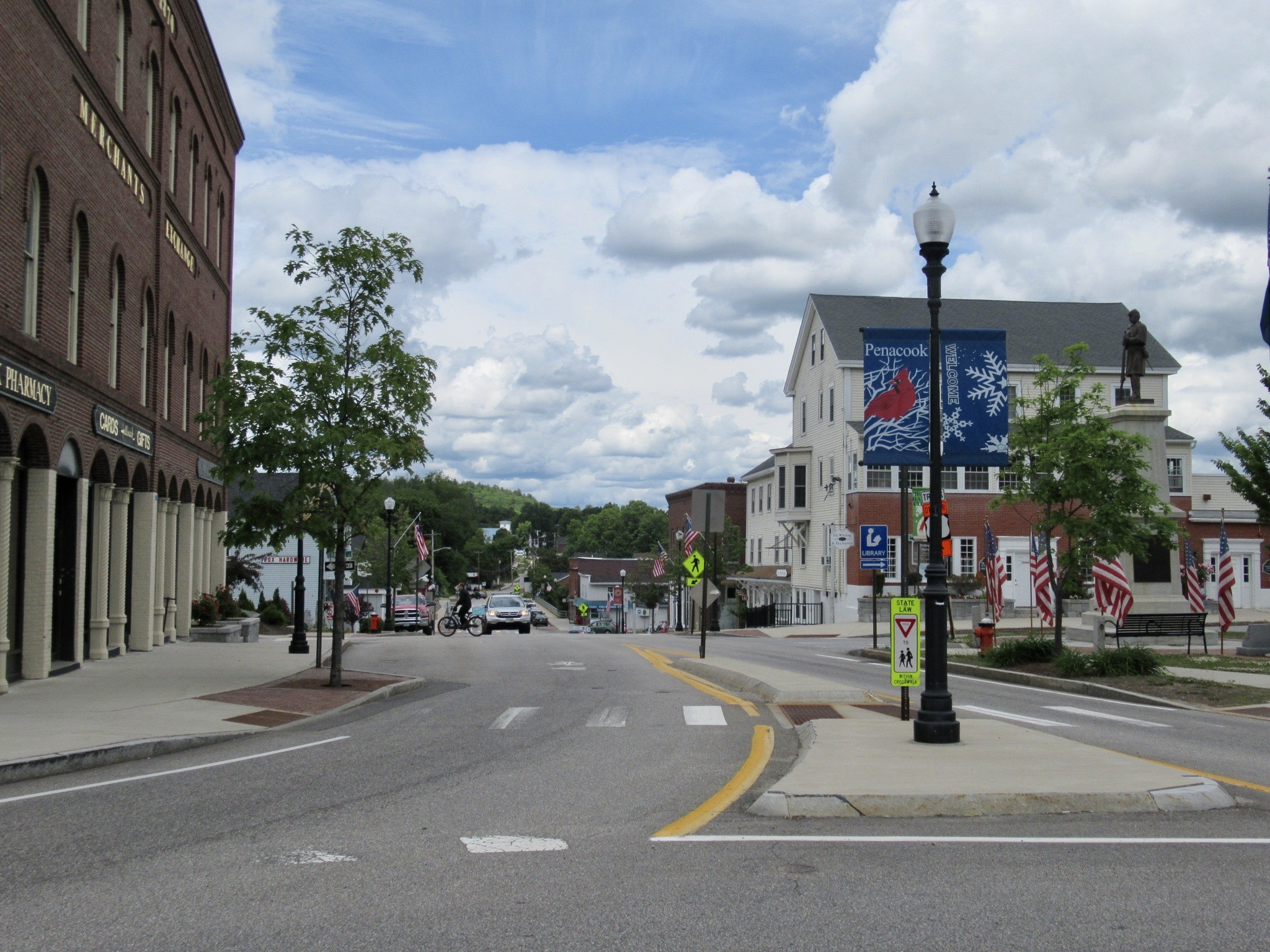
- Village Street in center of Penacook

- Location within New Hampshire Location within the United States
- Coordinates: 43°16′49″N 71°36′00″W
- Country: United States
- State: New Hampshire
- County: Merrimack
- City: Concord
- Elevation: 335 ft (102 m)

Population (2010)
  - Total: 1,273
- Time zone: UTC−5 (Eastern (EST))
  - Summer (DST): UTC−4 (EDT)
- ZIP Code: 03303
- Area code: 603
- GNIS feature ID: 869059

Penacook, originally called "Fisherville", is a village within the city of Concord in Merrimack County, New Hampshire, United States. It lies along Concord's northern border with Boscawen. The name comes from the Pennacook tribe that lived in the area. "Penacook" (Pennycook) was the original name of the plantation incorporated by present-day Concord.

Penacook is located along a stretch of the Contoocook River that falls 100 feet (30 m) in slightly over 1 mile (1.6 km), just before joining the Merrimack River. Early hydro-powered industry was attracted to the site, and Penacook grew as a mill town. While dams on the river still generate electricity, most of the 19th- and 20th-century factories, such as Allied Leather, have long since closed.

Penacook has its own phone exchange (753), which includes a portion of Boscawen, and its own ZIP Code (03303), shared with Boscawen, Webster, and parts of northern Concord east of the Merrimack River. Most of Penacook is located in the Merrimack Valley School District, though part is in the Concord School District.

== Notable person ==
- Red Rolfe, third baseman for New York Yankees and Dartmouth College athletic director

== Gallery ==
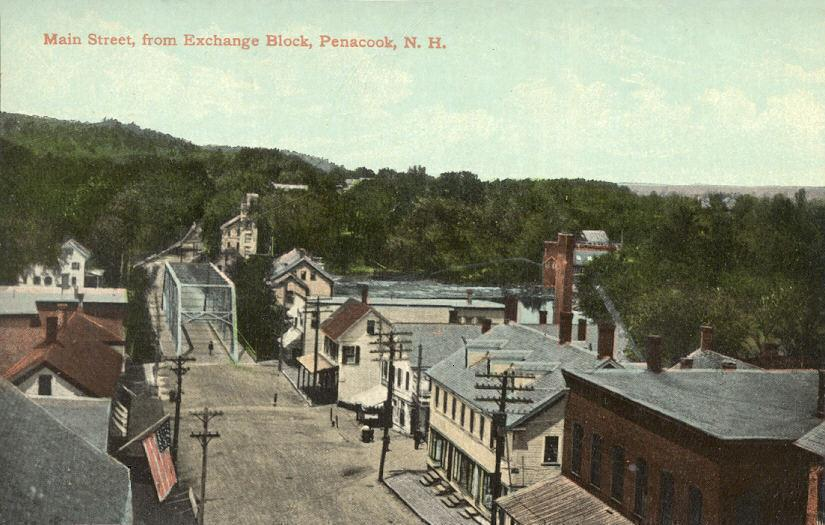
Village Street in 1911

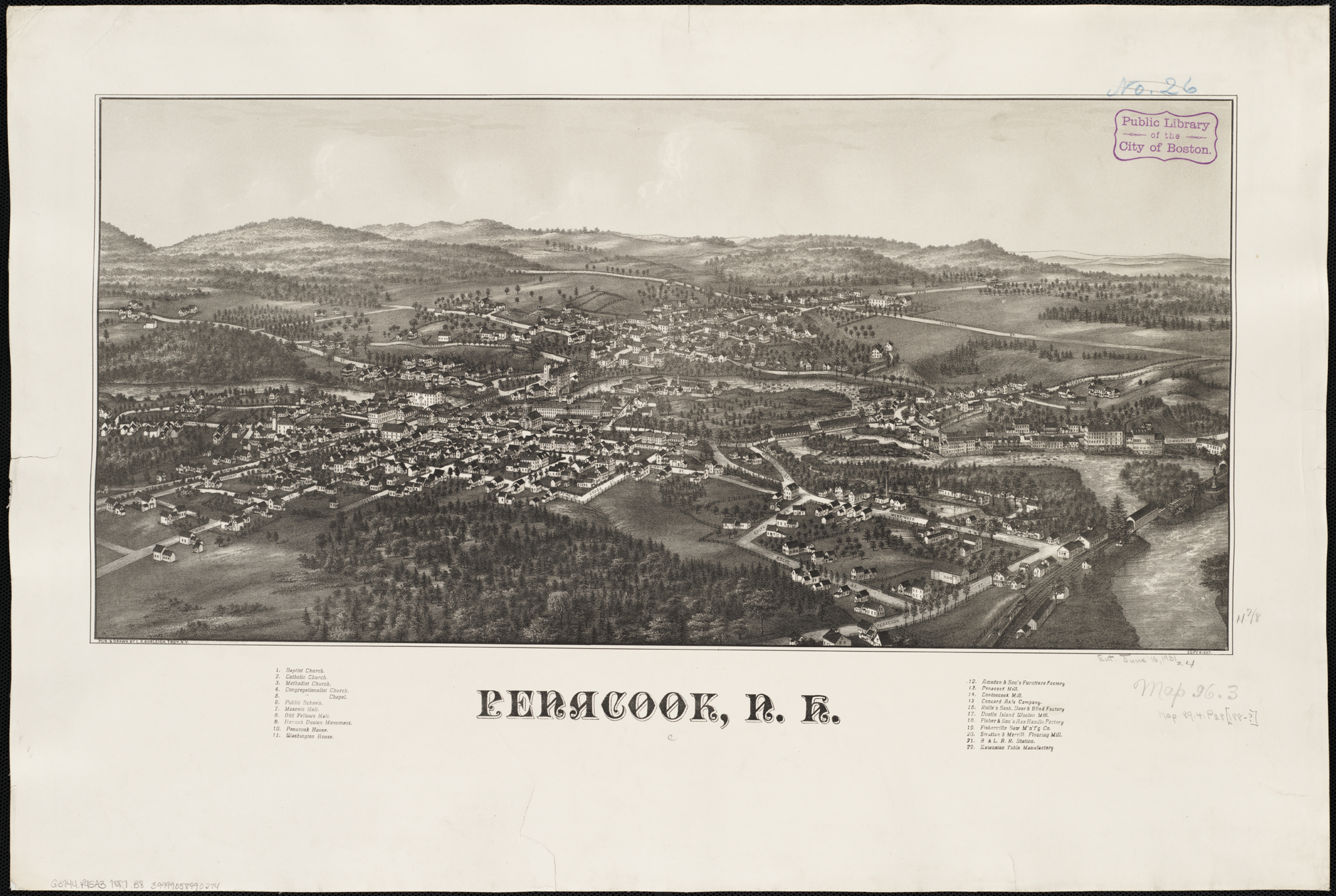
Print of Penacook by L. R. Burleigh with listings of landmarks
