= Vermont Catamounts men's basketball statistical leaders =

The Vermont Catamounts men's basketball statistical leaders are individual statistical leaders of the Vermont Catamounts men's basketball program in various categories, including points, three-pointers, assists, blocks, rebounds, and steals. Within those areas, the lists identify single-game, single-season, and career leaders. The Catamounts represent the University of Vermont in the NCAA's America East Conference.

Vermont began competing in intercollegiate basketball in 1900. However, the school's record book does not generally list records from before the 1950s, as records from before this period are often incomplete and inconsistent. Since scoring was much lower in this era, and teams played much fewer games during a typical season, it is likely that few or no players from this era would appear on these lists anyway.

The NCAA did not officially record assists as a stat until the 1983–84 season, and blocks and steals until the 1985–86 season, but Vermont's record books includes players in these stats before these seasons. These lists are updated through the end of the 2020–21 season.

== Scoring ==
Career
Rk	Player	Points	Seasons
1	Eddie Benton	2,474	1992–93 1993–94 1994–95 1995–96
2	Taylor Coppenrath	2,442	2001–02 2002–03 2003–04 2004–05
3	T. J. Sorrentine	2,013	2000–01 2001–02 2003–04 2004–05
4	Mike Trimboli	2,008	2005–06 2006–07 2007–08 2008–09
5	Anthony Lamb	1,933	2016–17 2017–18 2018–19 2019–20
6	Marqus Blakely	1,875	2006–07 2007–08 2008–09 2009–10
7	Tony Orciari	1,743	1997–98 1998–99 1999–00 2000–01
8	Mike Evelti	1,697	1978–79 1979–80 1980–81 1981–82
9	Trae Bell-Haynes	1,629	2014–15 2015–16 2016–17 2017–18
10	Kevin Roberson	1,503	1988–89 1989–90 1990–91 1991–92

Season
Rk	Player	Points	Season
1	Taylor Coppenrath	777	2004–05
2	Eddie Benton	687	1993–94
3	Anthony Lamb	678	2018–19
4	Eddie Benton	636	1995–96
5	Eddie Benton	619	1992–93
6	Marqus Blakely	607	2009–10
7	Taylor Coppenrath	604	2002–03
8	T. J. Sorrentine	581	2004–05
9	Matt Johnson	580	1990–91
10	Taylor Coppenrath	579	2003–04

Single game
Rk	Player	Points	Season	Opponent
1	Eddie Benton	54	1993–94	Drexel
2	T. J. Sorrentine	45	2001–02	Northeastern
	Eddie Benton	45	1995–96	Hartford
4	Taylor Coppenrath	43	2003–04	Maine
	Eddie Benton	43	1993–94	Colgate
	Eddie Benton	43	1993–94	Northeastern
	Frank Martiniuk	43	1968–69	S Conn
8	Anthony Lamb	42	2018–19	St. Bonaventure
	Eddie Benton	42	1995–96	Hofstra
	Eddie Benton	42	1995–96	Hartford
	Matt Johnson	42	1990–91	Delaware
	Ralph D’Altilia	42	1964–65	UNH

== Rebounds ==
Career
Rk	Player	Rebounds	Seasons
1	Brian Voelkel	1,168	2010–11 2011–12 2012–13 2013–14
2	Kevin Roberson	1,054	1988–89 1989–90 1990–91 1991–92
3	Marqus Blakely	1,044	2006–07 2007–08 2008–09 2009–10
4	Benny Becton	986	1960–61 1961–62 1962–63
5	Trevor Gaines	880	1998–99 1999–00 2000–01 2001–02
6	Taylor Coppenrath	839	2001–02 2002–03 2003–04 2004–05
7	Erik Nelson	795	1994–95 1995–96 1996–97 1997–98
8	Anthony Lamb	765	2016–17 2017–18 2018–19 2019–20
9	Milt Goggans	740	1963–64 1964–65 1965–66
10	Mike Evelti	735	1978–79 1979–80 1980–81 1981–82

Season
Rk	Player	Rebounds	Season
1	Chris Holm	401	2006–07
2	Benny Becton	350	1960–61
3	Benny Becton	341	1962–63
4	Marqus Blakely	327	2009–10
5	Trevor Gaines	320	2001–02
	Marqus Blakely	320	2007–08
7	Kevin Roberson	311	1990–91
	Brian Voelkel	311	2011–12

Single game
Rk	Player	Rebounds	Season	Opponent
1	Benny Becton	29	1962–63	Maine
2	Sam Alamutu	21	2024–25	Maine
	Kevin Roberson	21	1991–92	B.U.
	Rich Trela	21	1970–71	UNH
5	Craig Peper	20	1996–97	SMC
	Dave Ostrosky	20	1992–93	Cent. Conn.
	Dave Ostrosky	20	1992–93	Harvard
	George Peredy	20	1971–72	Norwich
	George Peredy	20	1972–73	Platt. St.
	Bob Hutton	20	1968–69	Norwich
	Marqus Blakely	20	2007–08	Hartford
	Marqus Blakely	20	2008–09	Maine

== Assists ==
Career
Rk	Player	Assists	Seasons
1	Brian Voelkel	679	2010–11 2011–12 2012–13 2013–14
2	Mike Trimboli	624	2005–06 2006–07 2007–08 2008–09
3	Kenny White	565	1988–89 1989–90 1990–91 1991–92
4	T. J. Sorrentine	548	2000–01 2001–02 2003–04 2004–05
5	Trae Bell-Haynes	518	2014–15 2015–16 2016–17 2017–18
6	Howard Hudson	511	1982–83 1983–84 1984–85 1985–86
7	Eddie Benton	458	1992–93 1993–94 1994–95 1995–96
8	David Roach	435	1996–97 1997–98 1998–99 1999–00
9	Robin Duncan	432	2018–19 2019–20 2020–21 2021–22 2022–23
10	Jeff Brown	428	1978–79 1979–80 1980–81 1981–82

Season
Rk	Player	Assists	Season
1	Brian Voelkel	190	2013–14
2	Brian Voelkel	184	2011–12
3	Howard Hudson	177	1985–86
4	Mike Trimboli	166	2005–06
	Mike Trimboli	166	2006–07
6	Brian Voelkel	162	2012–13
7	T. J. Sorrentine	159	2000–01
	Kenny White	159	1989–90

Single game
Rk	Player	Assists	Season	Opponent
1	T. J. Sorrentine	15	2000–01	Albany
2	Corey Wielgus	13	1981–82	Middlebury
3	T. J. Sorrentine	12	2000–01	UNH
	Eddie Benton	12	1992–93	Northeastern
	Warren Prehmus	12	1974–75	St. Mikes
	Howard Hudson	12	1983–84	St. Mikes
	Howard Hudson	12	1985–86	Yale
	Mike Trimboli	12	2005–06	Dartmouth

== Steals ==
Career
Rk	Player	Steals	Seasons
1	Howard Hudson	253	1982–83 1983–84 1984–85 1985–86
2	Marqus Blakely	226	2006–07 2007–08 2008–09 2009–10
3	Mike Trimboli	213	2005–06 2006–07 2007–08 2008–09
4	Brian Voelkel	207	2010–11 2011–12 2012–13 2013–14
5	Jeff Brown	170	1978–79 1979–80 1980–81 1981–82
6	T. J. Sorrentine	165	2000–01 2001–02 2003–04 2004–05
7	Germain Mopa Njila	157	2001–02 2002–03 2003–04 2004–05
8	Scott Reed	151	1991–92 1992–93 1993–94 1994–95
9	Trae Bell-Haynes	148	2014–15 2015–16 2016–17 2017–18
10	Kenny White	146	1988–89 1989–90 1990–91 1991–92

Season
Rk	Player	Steals	Season
1	Marqus Blakely	85	2009–10
2	Howard Hudson	77	1982–83
3	Howard Hudson	72	1983–84
4	Marqus Blakely	67	2008–09
5	Scott Reed	63	1993–94
	Dre Wills	63	2014–15

Single game
Rk	Player	Steals	Season	Opponent
1	Howard Hudson	9	1982–83	St. Mike’s
2	Howard Hudson	8	1982–83	Northeastern
3	Howard Hudson	7	1983–84	Canisius
	Howard Hudson	7	1984–85	Maine
	Howard Hudson	7	1985–86	Utica
	Shamir Bogues	7	2024–25	Binghamton

== Blocks ==
Career
Rk	Player	Blocks	Seasons
1	Kevin Roberson	409	1988–89 1989–90 1990–91 1991–92
2	Erik Nelson	282	1994–95 1995–96 1996–97 1997–98
3	Marqus Blakely	254	2006–07 2007–08 2008–09 2009–10
4	Ethan O’Day	217	2012–13 2013–14 2014–15 2015–16
5	Anthony Lamb	160	2016–17 2017–18 2018–19 2019–20
6	Evan Fjeld	131	2007–08 2008–09 2009–10 2010–11
	Ileri Ayo-Faleye	131	2022–23 2023–24 2024–25
8	Scotty Jones	124	1999–00 2000–01 2001–02 2002–03 2003–04
9	Colin McIntosh	93	2005–06 2006–07 2007–08 2008–09
10	Drew Urquhart	86	2014–15 2015–16 2016–17 2017–18

Season
Rk	Player	Blocks	Season
1	Kevin Roberson	139	1991–92
2	Kevin Roberson	114	1989–90
3	Kevin Roberson	104	1990–91
4	Marqus Blakely	88	2008–09
5	Marqus Blakely	79	2007–08

Single game
Rk	Player	Blocks	Season	Opponent
1	Kevin Roberson	13	1991–92	UNH
2	Kevin Roberson	11	1989–90	Dart.
3	Kevin Roberson	10	1990–91	Hartford
	Kevin Roberson	10	1989–90	Cent. Ct.
	Kevin Roberson	10	1991–92	Cornell
