= 2004–05 Vermont Catamounts men's basketball team =

American college basketball season

2004–05 Vermont Catamounts men's basketball

America East Regular season champions America East tournament champions

NCAA tournament, second round
- Conference: America East Conference
- Record: 25–7 (16–2 America East)
- Head coach: Tom Brennan (19th season)
- Home arena: Patrick Gym

2004–05 America East Conference men's basketball standings
	Conf.				Overall
Team	W		L	PCT	W		L	PCT
Vermont †	16	–	2	.889	25	–	7	.781
Northeastern	15	–	3	.833	21	–	10	.677
Boston University	14	–	4	.778	20	–	9	.690
Albany	9	–	9	.500	13	–	15	.464
Binghamton	8	–	10	.444	12	–	17	.414
Maine	8	–	10	.444	14	–	15	.483
Stony Brook	6	–	12	.333	12	–	17	.414
New Hampshire	5	–	13	.278	9	–	19	.321
UMBC	5	–	13	.278	11	–	18	.379
Hartford	4	–	14	.222	8	–	20	.286
† 2005 America East tournament winner

The 2004–05 Vermont Catamounts men's basketball team represented the University of Vermont during the 2004–05 NCAA Division I men's basketball season. The Catamounts, led by head coach Tom Brennan – coaching in his 19th and final season, played their home games at Patrick Gym and were members of the America East Conference. They finished the season 25–7, 16–2 in America East play to win the regular season conference title. They followed that success by winning the America East tournament to earn an automatic bid to the NCAA tournament. Playing as the No. 13 seed in the Austin region, the Catamounts knocked off No. 4 seed Syracuse in the opening round before losing to No. 5 seed and eventual Final Four participant Michigan State in the round of 32.

This season marked the third straight season the Catamounts played in the NCAA Tournament, while also earning their first NCAA Tournament victory. Senior forward Taylor Coppenrath established the single-season scoring record at Vermont and finished second on the school's all-time scoring list. Fellow senior, guard T. J. Sorrentine finished his career a spot behind Coppenrath. Through the 2021–22 season, both players remain on the top 10 list in two other categories – rebounds and blocks for Coppenrath, and assists and steals for Sorrentine.

== Roster ==
2004–05 Vermont Catamounts men's basketball team
Players
Coaches

Pos.	#	Name	Height	Weight	Year	Previous school	Hometown
G	11	T. J. Sorrentine	5 ft 11 in (1.8 m)	185 lb (84 kg)	Sr	St. Raphael Academy	Pawtucket, Rhode Island
F	22	Taylor Coppenrath	6 ft 9 in (2.06 m)	240 lb (109 kg)	Sr	St. Johnsbury Academy	Barnet, Vermont

Head coach

- Tom Brennan

Assistant coach(es)

Legend

- (C) Team captain
- (S) Suspended
- (I) Ineligible
- (W) Walk-on
- Injured
- Current redshirt

Roster

== Schedule and results ==
Date time, TV	Rank^{#}	Opponent^{#}	Result	Record	Site (attendance) city, state
Regular season
Nov 19, 2004*		at No. 1 Kansas	L 61–68	0–1	Allen Fieldhouse (16,300); Lawrence, Kansas
Nov 26, 2004*		Marist	W 90–70	1–1	Patrick Gym (3,266); Burlington, Vermont
Nov 28, 2004*		Iona	W 79–57	2–1	Patrick Gym (3,266); Burlington, Vermont
Dec 4, 2004*		at American	L 64–67	2–2	Bender Arena (1,567); Washington, D.C.
Dec 19, 2004		Binghamton	W 83–53	3–2 (1–0)	Patrick Gym (3,266); Burlington, Vermont
Dec 21, 2004*		at No. 4 North Carolina	L 65–93	3–3	Dean Smith Center (19,717); Chapel Hill, North Carolina
Feb 19, 2005*		at Nevada	L 64–74	19–5	Lawlor Events Center (10,237); Reno, Nevada
Feb 27, 2005		at Maine	L 66–87	21–6 (16–2)	Alfond Arena (2,714); Orono, Maine
America East tournament
Mar 5, 2005*		vs. UMBC; Quarterfinals	W 76–61	22–6	Events Center (5,222); Binghamton, New York
Mar 6, 2005*		at Binghamton; Semifinals	W 76–65	23–6	Events Center (5,003); Binghamton, New York
Mar 12, 2005*		Northeastern; Championship game	W 80–57	24–6	Patrick Gym (3,266); Burlington, Vermont
NCAA Tournament
Mar 18, 2005*	(13 AUS)	vs. (4 AUS) No. 11 Syracuse; First Round	W 60–57 ^{OT}	25–6	DCU Center (13,009); Worcester, Massachusetts
Mar 20, 2005*	(13 AUS)	vs. (5 AUS) No. 15 Michigan State; Second Round	L 61–72	25–7	DCU Center (13,008); Worcester, Massachusetts
*Non-conference game. ^{#}Rankings from AP Poll. (#) Tournament seedings in parentheses. AUS=Austin. All times are in Eastern Time.

== Awards and honors ==
- Taylor Coppenrath – America East Player of the Year (3x)
