= Ron Perry (basketball, born 1958) =

Basketball player

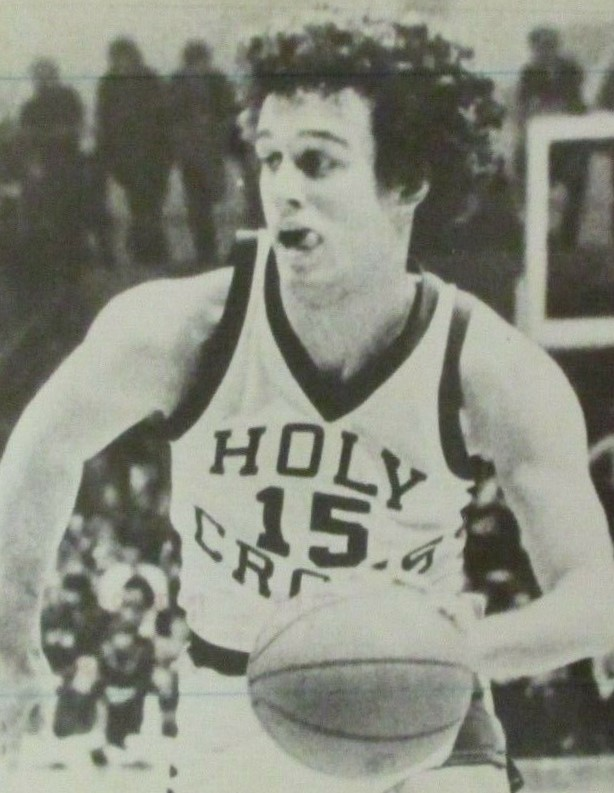

Personal information
- Born: March 20, 1958 (age 68) Boston, Massachusetts, U.S.
- Listed height: 6 ft 2 in (1.88 m)
- Listed weight: 180 lb (82 kg)

Career information
- High school: Catholic Memorial (West Roxbury, Massachusetts)
- College: Holy Cross (1976–1980)
- NBA draft: 1980: 3rd round, 54th overall pick
- Drafted by: Boston Celtics
- Position: Shooting guard
- Number: 15

Career highlights
- ECAC North Co-Player of the Year (1980); 3× First-team Academic All-American (1978–1980); 3× First-team All-ECAC (1977, 1979, 1980); ECAC North tournament MVP (1980); No. 15 retired by Holy Cross Crusaders; First-team Parade All-American (1976); Third-team Parade All-American (1975)
- Stats at Basketball Reference

Ronald Kevin Perry (born March 20, 1958) is an American former basketball and baseball player. He is known particularly for his standout college career at Holy Cross.

Perry, the son of former Holy Cross athletic director Ron Perry, was a high school star at Catholic Memorial in West Roxbury, Massachusetts. While there, Perry set a Massachusetts state scoring record with 2,481 points in his career, averaging 35 points per game as a senior.

He followed in his father's footsteps, playing both basketball and baseball at Holy Cross. As a freshman shooting guard for the Crusaders, Perry led all freshmen nationally in scoring, netting 23 points per game. Over the course of his four-year career, Perry set the school scoring record with 2,524 points (23.2 per game). He was named ECAC North co-Player of the Year with Maine's Rufus Harris as a senior and earned All-American recognition in all four of his varsity seasons.

In addition to his basketball career, Perry also excelled as a baseball player for the Crusaders at shortstop. In 1978 and 1979 he played collegiate summer baseball for the Hyannis Mets of the Cape Cod Baseball League (CCBL). At Hyannis, Perry was a two-time all-star, batting .357 and .401 in his two seasons. In the 1979 season he led the Mets to the league championship while being named the league MVP. In 2003, Perry was inducted into the CCBL Hall of Fame. Perry was also recognized for his achievements in the classroom, earning first team Academic All-American honors in each of his last three seasons in both baseball and basketball. He was inducted into the Academic All-American Hall of Fame in 1996.

Following his graduation from Holy Cross, Perry was drafted by both the Chicago White Sox in the 1980 Major League Baseball draft and by the Boston Celtics in the third round (54th pick overall) of the 1980 NBA draft. After failing to make the Celtics' roster, Perry opted to try his hand at baseball, playing for the White Sox' AA affiliate in Glens Falls, New York. He hit .260 in his two seasons with the club.
