= Vermont Mr. Basketball =

American high school sports award

- Description: Honor recognizing the top boys high school basketball player in the state of Vermont
- Country: United States
- Presented by: Burlington Free Press

The Vermont Mr. Basketball honor recognizes the top high school basketball player in the state of Vermont. The award is presented annually by the Burlington Free Press, since 1991.

== Award winners ==
Year	Player	High school	Class	College
2026	Pascal Munezero	Rice Memorial	Junior	
2025	Abdi Sharif	Burlington	Senior	
2024	Drew Bessette	Rice	Senior	Vermont
2023	Sawyer Ramey	Fair Haven	Senior	Middlebury
2022	Jonah Cattaneo	Montpelier	Senior	Lasell
2021	Michel Ndayishimiye (2)	Rice	Senior	Vermont
2020	Michel Ndayishimiye	Rice	Junior	Vermont
2019	Alex Carlisle	St. Johnsbury	Senior	Wheaton
2018	Noah Tyson	Rutland	Senior	Colby
2017	Calvin Carter	Enosburg	Senior	Castleton
2016	Ben Shungu (2)	Rice	Senior	Vermont
2015	Ben Shungu	Rice	Junior	
2014	Pavin Parrish	Rochester	Senior	Castleton
2013	Matt St. Amour	Missisquoi	Senior	Middlebury
2012	Matt St. Amour	Missisquoi	Junior	
2011	Ben Ferris	Essex	Senior	Tufts
2010	Joe O'Shea	Burlington	Senior	Holy Cross/Bryant
2009	Clancy Rugg	Burlington	Senior	Vermont
2008	Joe O'Shea	Burlington	Sophomore	
2007	Tyrone Conley	Burlington	Senior	New Hampshire
2006	Matt Glass	Mount Mansfield	Senior	Massachusetts/Vermont
2005	Matt Glass	Mount Mansfield	Senior	
2004	Chad Powlovich	Mount Mansfield	Senior	Vermont
2003	Kyle Cieplicki	Rice	Senior	Vermont
2002	B.J. Robertson	Burlington	Senior	St. Michael's
2001	Tim Shedd	Hazen	Senior	Norwich
2000	Taylor Coppenrath	St. Johnsbury	Senior	Vermont
1999	Matt Sheftic	Essex	Senior	Vermont
1998	Cam Robinson	Essex	Senior	
1997	Tony Orciari	St. Johnsbury	Senior	Vermont
1996	Tony Orciari	St. Johnsbury	Junior	
1995	Josh Albee	Bellows Falls	Senior	Green Mountain
1994	Marc Ferio	Colchester	Senior	
1993	Jamie Kingsbury	Oxbow	Senior	Lyndon State
1992	Brent Kendall	Milton	Senior	St. Michael's
1991	Bernie Cieplicki	Rice	Senior	Fairfield/Vermont

=== Schools with multiple winners ===
School	Number of Awards	Years
Rice	7	1991, 2003, 2015, 2016, 2020, 2021, 2024
Burlington	6	2002, 2007, 2008, 2009, 2010, 2025
St. Johnsbury	4	1996, 1997, 2000, 2019
Essex	3	1998, 1999, 2011
Mount Mansfield	3	2004, 2005, 2006
Missisquoi	2	2012, 2013
Enosburg	1	2017
Rutland	1	2018
