= America East Conference Men's Basketball Player of the Year =

US sporting award

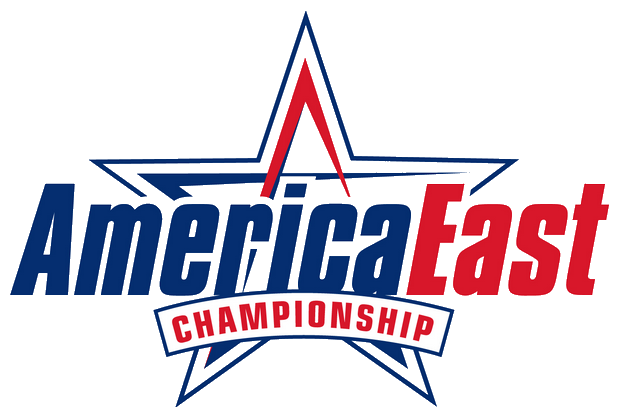
- Awarded for: the most outstanding basketball player in the America East Conference
- Country: United States

History
- First award: 1980
- Most recent: TJ Hurley, Vermont

The America East Conference Men's Basketball Player of the Year, known also as the Kevin Roberson America East Conference Men's Basketball Player of the Year, is an award given to the America East Conference's most outstanding player. The award was first given following the 1979–80 season, the first year of the conference's existence (then called ECAC North). Ten players have earned the award multiple times. Only three, however, have been named player of the year three times: Reggie Lewis of Northeastern (1985–1987), Taylor Coppenrath of Vermont (2003–2005), and Jameel Warney of Stony Brook (2014–2016).

The award was named in honor of former winner Kevin Roberson of Vermont after he was killed by a drunk driver in his hometown of Buffalo, New York in May 1993.

Vermont has had the most all-time awards with 16. Former members Northeastern, Stony Brook, and Boston University (which respectively left in 2005, 2022, and 2013) are second with five, while four other schools have at least two awards apiece. In terms of individual winners, Vermont and BU are tied for the lead with five each. There has been one co-player of the year award tie (1979–80). Coincidentally, it was the first year that the award was given.

== Key ==
†	Co-Players of the Year
*	Awarded a national player of the year award that same season: UPI Player of the Year (1954–55 to 1995–96); Oscar Robertson Trophy (1958–59 to present); Naismith Player of the Year (1968–69 to present); John R. Wooden Award (1976–77 to present)
Player (X)	Denotes the number of times the player has been awarded the America East Player of the Year award at that point

== Winners ==
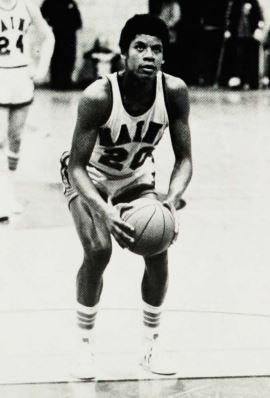
Rufus Harris, Maine, 1980

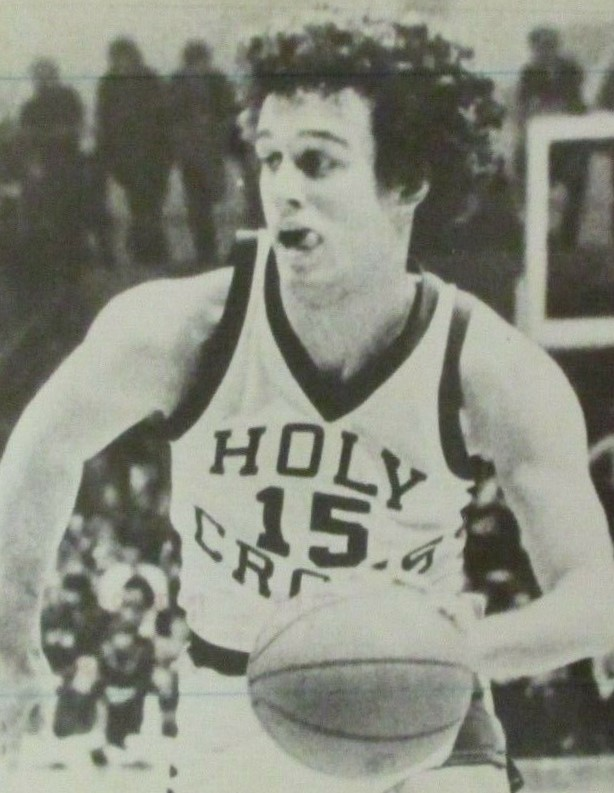
Ron Perry, Holy Cross, 1980

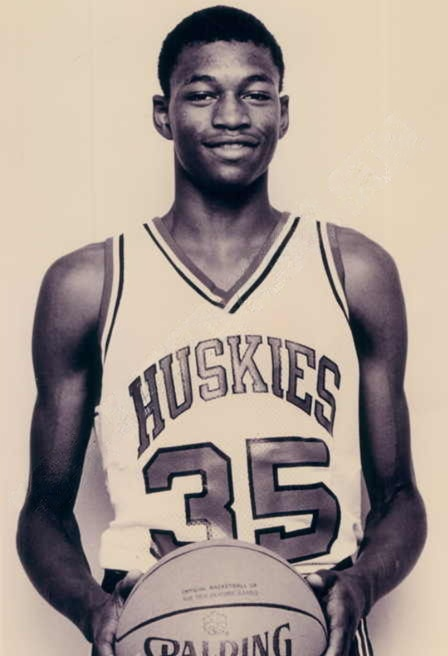
Reggie Lewis, Northeastern, 1985 through 1987

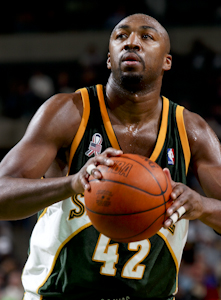
Vin Baker, Hartford, 1993

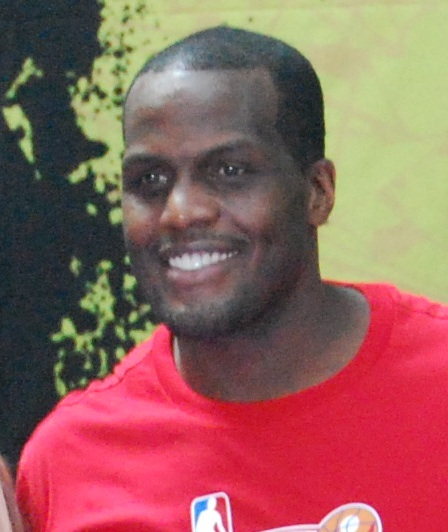
Malik Rose, Drexel, 1995 and 1996

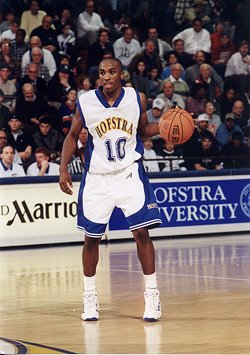
Speedy Claxton, Hofstra, 1998 and 2000

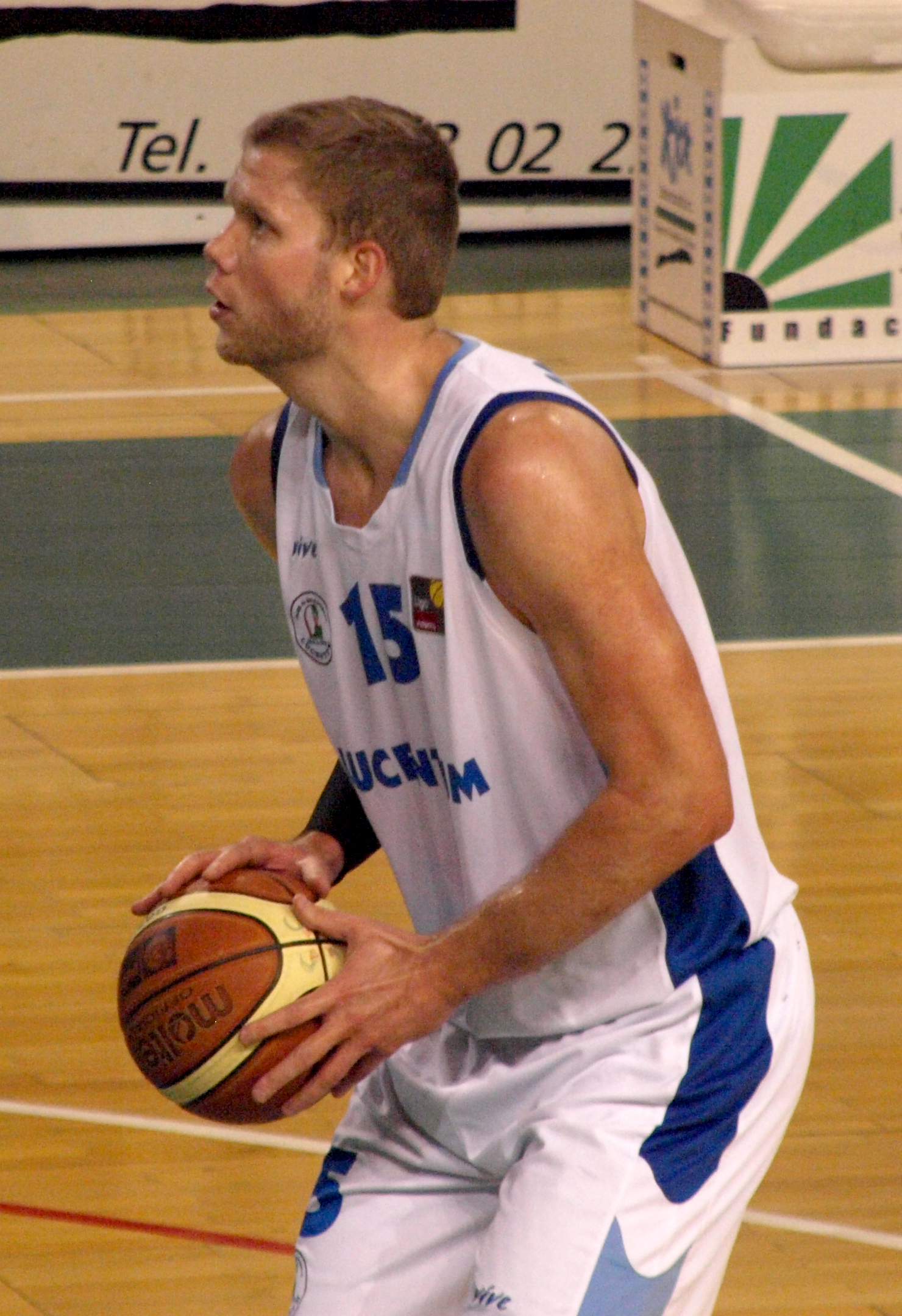
Taylor Coppenrath, Vermont, 2003 through 2005

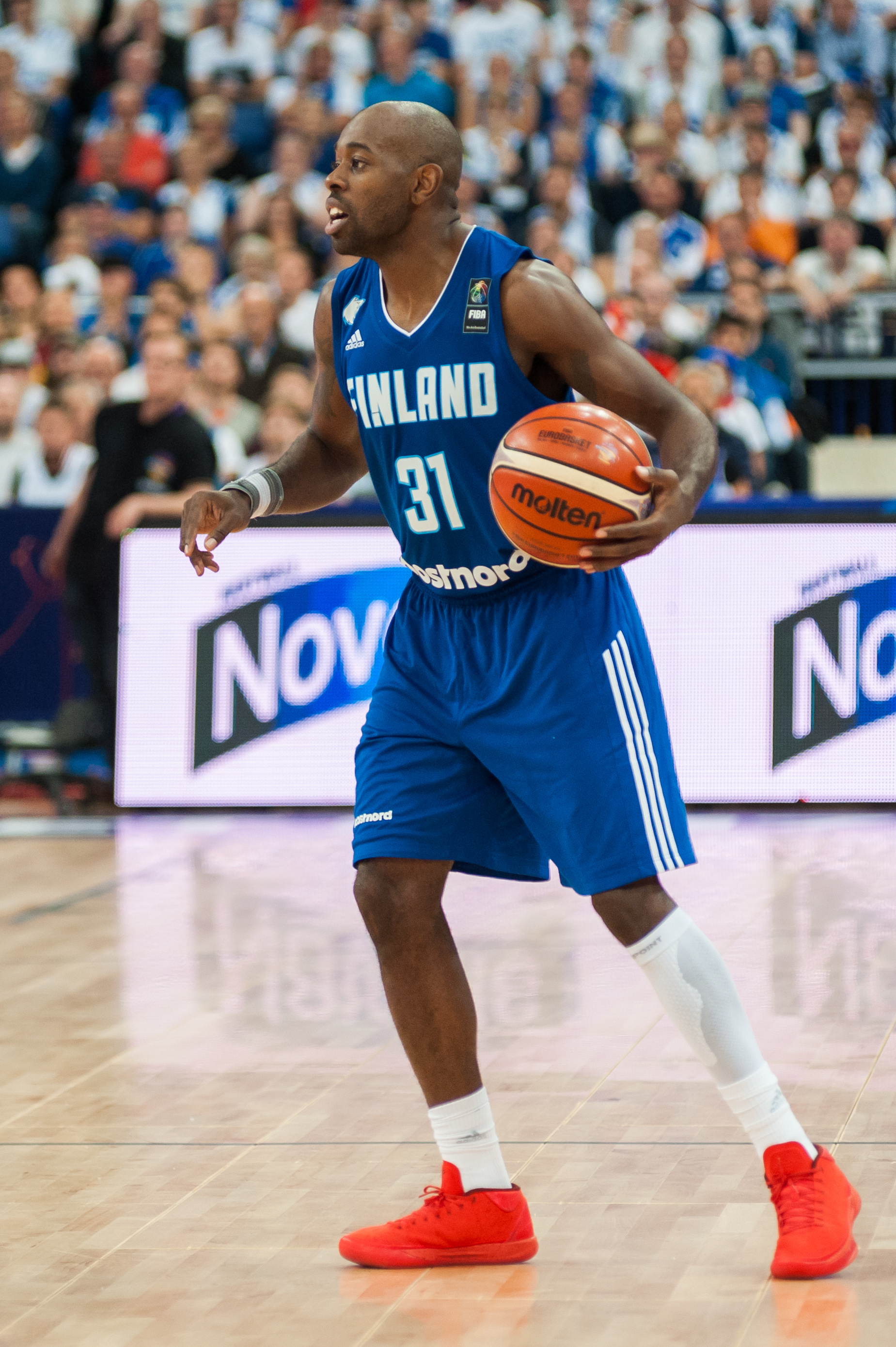
Jamar Wilson, Albany, 2006 and 2007

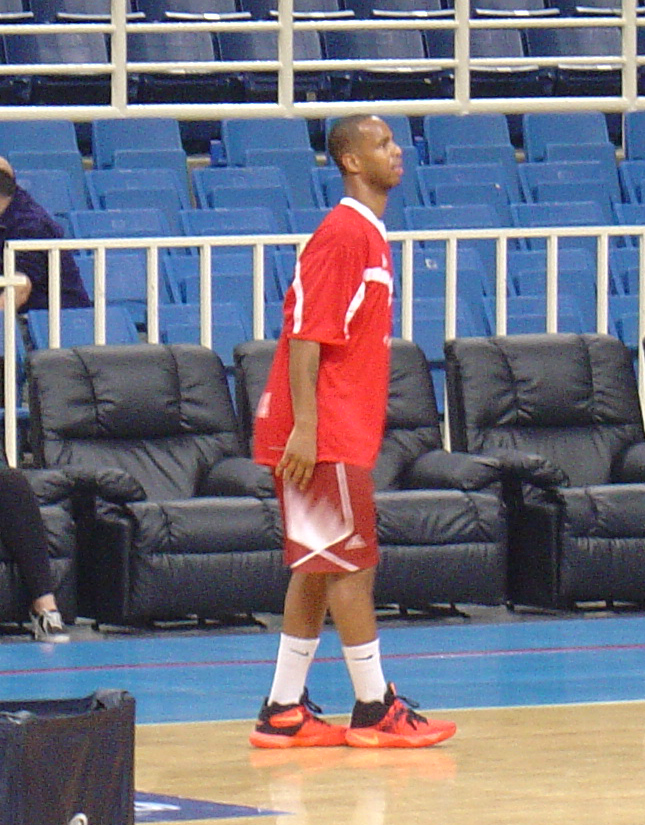
Muhammad El-Amin, Stony Brook, 2010

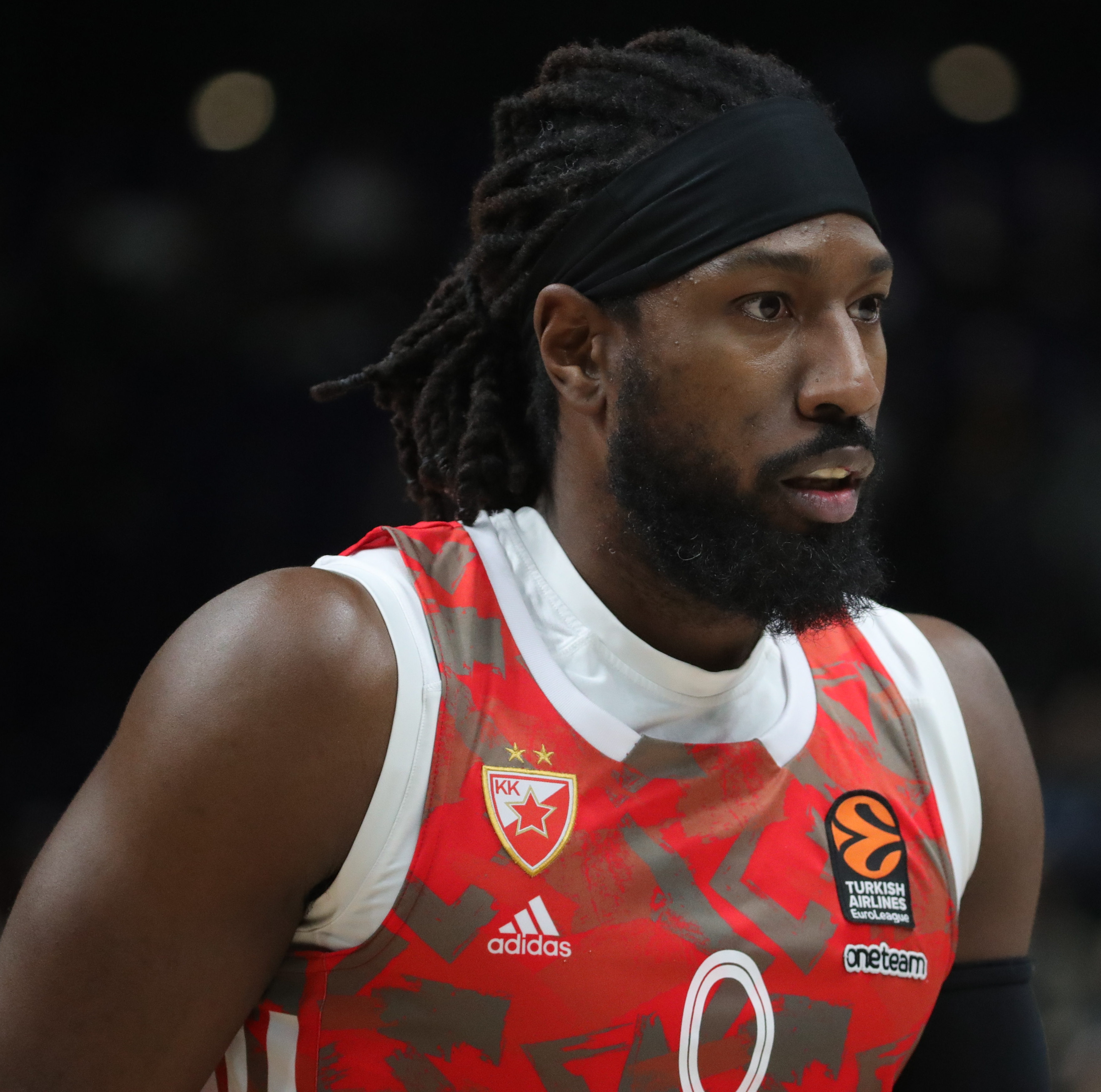
John Holland, Boston University, 2011

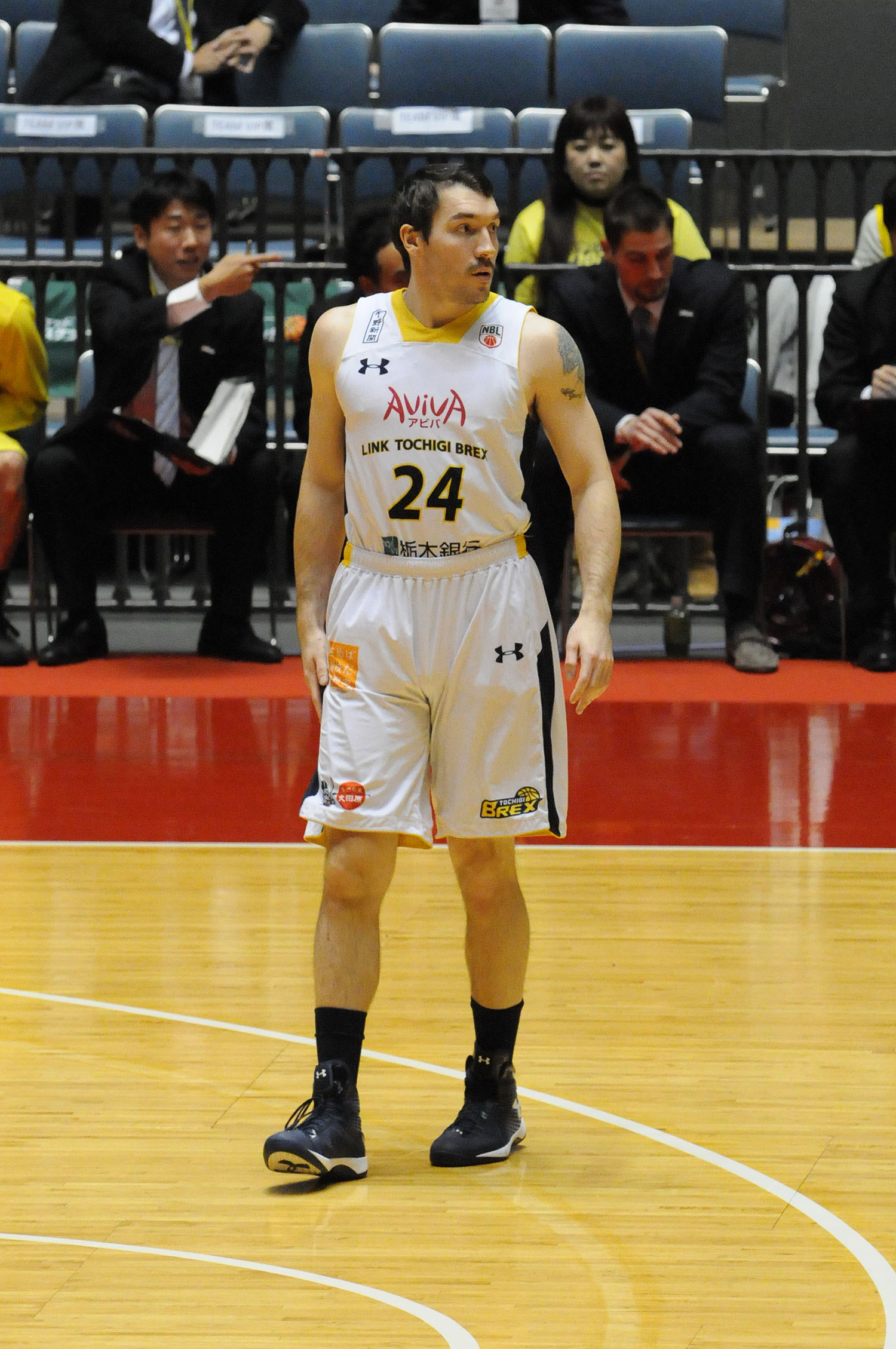
Tommy Brenton, Stony Brook, 2013

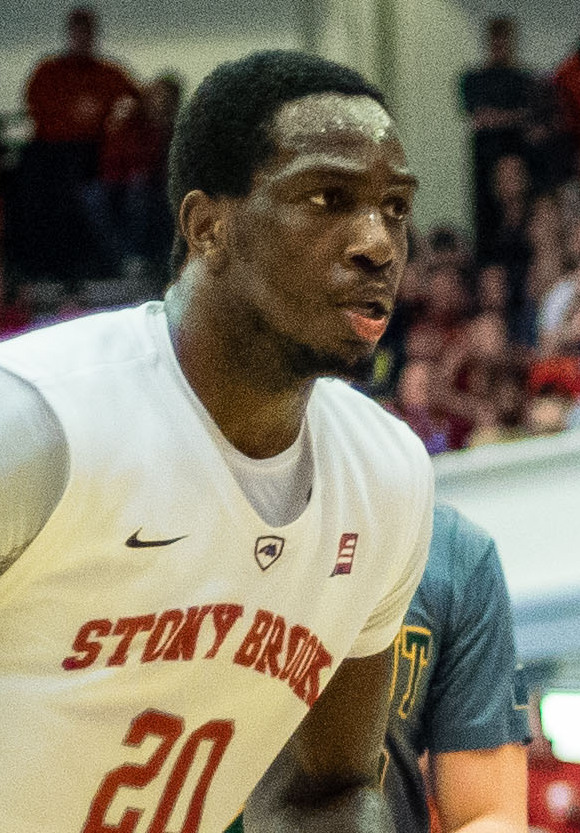
Jameel Warney, Stony Brook, 2014 through 2016

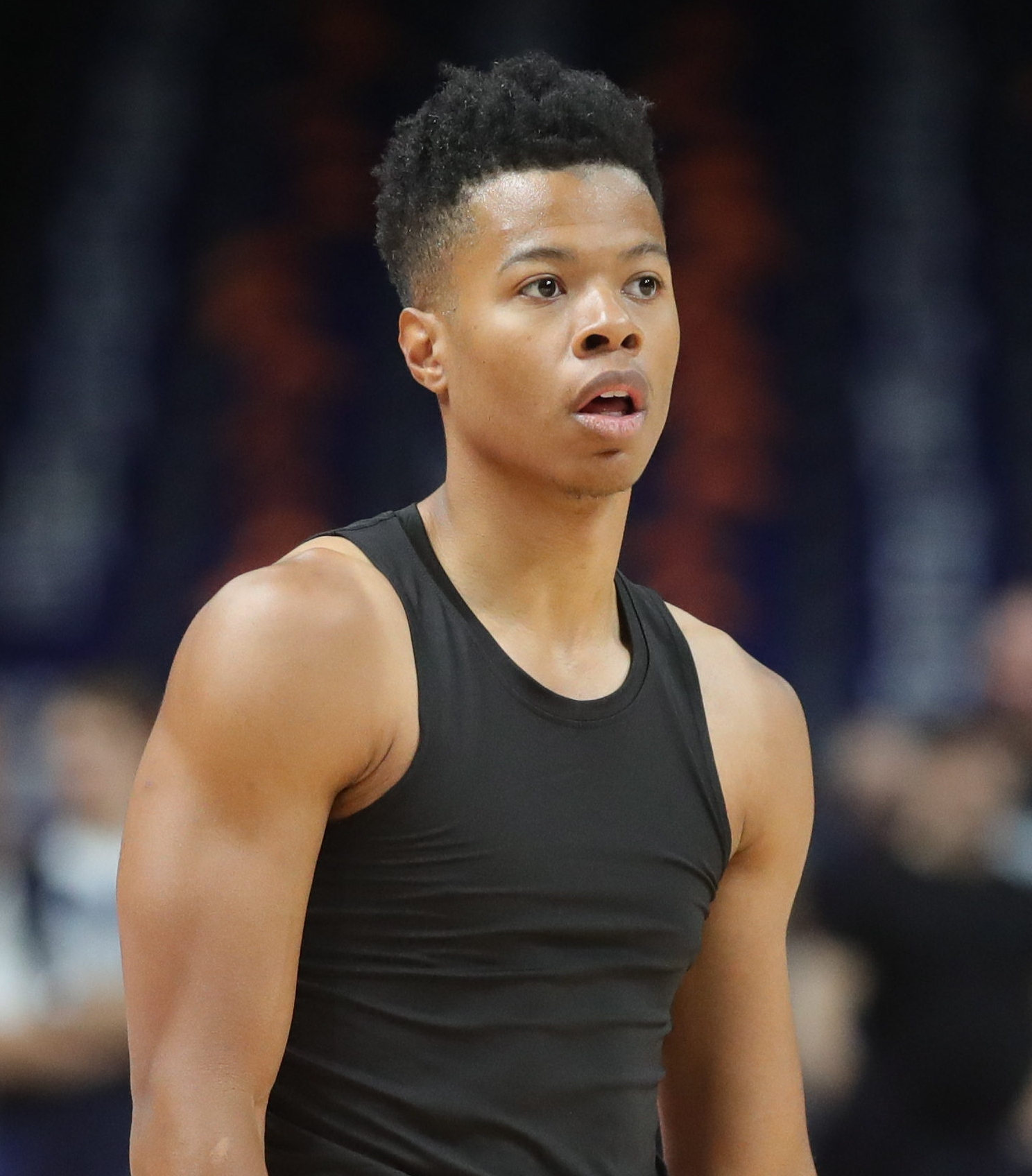
Trae Bell-Haynes, Vermont, 2017 and 2018

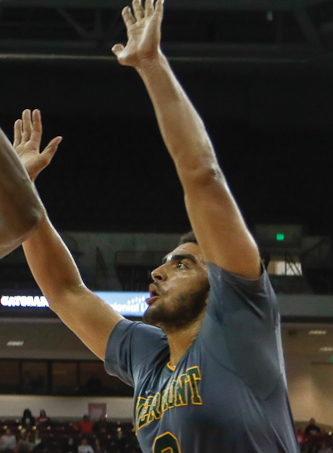
Anthony Lamb, Vermont, 2019 and 2020

Season	Player	School	Position	Class	Reference
1979–80^{†}	Rufus Harris	Maine	SF	Senior	
1979–80^{†}	Ron Perry	Holy Cross	SG	Senior	
1980–81	Mike Ferrara	Colgate	SG	Senior	
1981–82	Perry Moss	Northeastern	PG / SG	Junior	
1982–83	Jeff Cross	Maine	C	Junior	
1983–84	Mark Halsel	Northeastern	F	Senior	
1984–85	Reggie Lewis	Northeastern	SF	Sophomore	
1985–86	Reggie Lewis (2)	Northeastern	SF	Junior	
1986–87	Reggie Lewis (3)	Northeastern	SF	Senior	
1987–88	Larry Jones	Boston University	PF	Senior	
1988–89	Jeff Robinson	Siena	SF / SG	Junior	
1989–90	Steven Key	Boston University	PG	Senior	
1990–91	Matt Johnson	Vermont	SF	Senior	
1991–92	Kevin Roberson	Vermont	C	Senior	
1992–93	Vin Baker	Hartford	C	Senior	
1993–94	Scott Drapeau	New Hampshire	PF	Junior	
1994–95	Malik Rose	Drexel	PF	Junior	
1995–96	Malik Rose (2)	Drexel	PF	Senior	
1996–97	Tunji Awojobi	Boston University	PF	Senior	
1997–98	Speedy Claxton	Hofstra	PG	Sophomore	
1998–99	Mike Pegues	Delaware	PF	Junior	
1999–00	Speedy Claxton (2)	Hofstra	PG	Senior	
2000–01	Norman Richardson	Hofstra	SG	Senior	
2001–02	T. J. Sorrentine	Vermont	PG	Sophomore	
2002–03	Taylor Coppenrath	Vermont	PF	Sophomore	
2003–04	Taylor Coppenrath (2)	Vermont	PF	Junior	
2004–05	Taylor Coppenrath (3)	Vermont	PF	Senior	
2005–06	Jamar Wilson	Albany	SG	Junior	
2006–07	Jamar Wilson (2)	Albany	SG	Senior	
2007–08	Marqus Blakely	Vermont	PF	Sophomore	
2008–09	Marqus Blakely (2)	Vermont	PF	Junior	
2009–10	Muhammad El-Amin	Stony Brook	SG	Senior	
2010–11	John Holland	Boston University	SG / SF	Senior	
2011–12	Darryl Partin	Boston University	SG	Senior	
2012–13	Tommy Brenton	Stony Brook	SF	Senior	
2013–14	Jameel Warney	Stony Brook	PF	Sophomore	
2014–15	Jameel Warney (2)	Stony Brook	PF	Junior	
2015–16	Jameel Warney (3)	Stony Brook	PF	Senior	
2016–17	Trae Bell-Haynes	Vermont	PG	Junior	
2017–18	Trae Bell-Haynes (2)	Vermont	PG	Senior	
2018–19	Anthony Lamb	Vermont	PF	Junior	
2019–20	Anthony Lamb (2)	Vermont	PF	Senior	
2020–21	Ryan Davis	Vermont	PF	Junior	
2021–22	Ryan Davis (2)	Vermont	PF	Senior	
2022–23	Finn Sullivan	Vermont	SG	Graduate	
2023–24	Clarence Daniels	New Hampshire	SF	Senior	
2024–25	Earl Timberlake	Bryant	SG	Senior	
2025–26	TJ Hurley	Vermont	G	Senior	

== Winners by school ==
School (year joined)	Winners	Years
Vermont (1979)	16	1991, 1992, 2002, 2003, 2004, 2005, 2008, 2009, 2017, 2018, 2019, 2020, 2021, 2022, 2023, 2026
Boston University (1979) (Note: Boston University left for the Patriot League in 2013.)	5	1988, 1990, 1997, 2011, 2012
Northeastern (1979) (Note: Northeastern left for the Colonial Athletic Association (CAA) in 2005.)	5	1982, 1984, 1985, 1986, 1987
Stony Brook (2001) (Note: Stony Brook left for the CAA in July 2022.)	5	2010, 2013, 2014, 2015, 2016
Hofstra (1994) (Note: Delaware, Drexel, and Hofstra all left in 2001 to join the CAA.)	3	1998, 2000, 2001
Albany (2001)	2	2006, 2007
Drexel (1991)	2	1995, 1996
Maine (1979)	2	1980^{†}, 1983
New Hampshire (1979)	2	1994, 2024
Bryant (2022)	1	2025
Colgate (1979) (Note: Colgate left in 1990 to join its football team in the Patriot League.)	1	1981
Delaware (1991)	1	1999
Hartford (1985) (Note: Hartford's final season in the America East was in 2021–22 as part of a transition process to drop their affiliation down to NCAA Division III starting in 2023–24.)	1	1993
Holy Cross (1979) (Note: Holy Cross left in 1983 to join the MAAC. The Crusaders are now in the Patriot League.)	1	1980^{†}
Siena (1984) (Note: Siena left in 1989 to join the MAAC.)	1	1989
Binghamton (2001)	0	
NJIT (2020)	0	—
UMass Lowell (2013)	0	—
UMBC (2003)	0	—
