= Claire G. Cayward =

American basketball player and coach (1903–1969)

Biographical details
- Born: April 9, 1903; Seneca Castle, New York, U.S.
- Died: November 28, 1969 (aged 66); Peterborough, New Hampshire, U.S.

Playing career
- 1921–1925: Vermont

Coaching career (HC unless noted)
- 1928–1929: Vermont

Head coaching record
- Overall: 8–10

Claire Glendon Cayward (April 9, 1903 – November 28, 1969) was an American basketball player and coach at the University of Vermont.

== Early life ==
Cayward was born on April 9, 1903, in Seneca Castle, New York. He attended the Canandaigua Academy in Canandaigua, New York.

== University of Vermont ==
Cayward was the first athlete to letter in four sports (baseball, football, basketball, and track) at the University of Vermont. He was a member of the Vermont Catamounts men's basketball for four seasons and was captain for two. During his senior season, Vermont won the New England College Championship and Cayward was named to the All-New-England basketball team. He only played one season of football (1924), but scored the only touchdown in Vermont's 33–7 loss to Boston College and made a touchdown-saving tackle against Marquette. Cayward was also a standout for the UVM baseball team as well as the Saranac Lake collegiate summer baseball team. He was offered a contract by the Washington Senators, but declined in order to attend the University of Vermont's medical school. Cayward coached the Catamounts men's basketball team during the 1928–29 season. He was inducted into the University of Vermont Athletic Hall of Fame in 1970.

== Medicine ==
After graduating from medical school, Cayward interned at the New Britain General Hospital in New Britain, Connecticut. In 1930, he moved to New Ipswich, New Hampshire, where he was to practice for a year before becoming a resident in obstetrics at Brooklyn Methodist Hospital. However, Cayward chose to remain in the town and practiced until 1969. Cayward delivered nearly 2,000 babies in New Ipswich and was the town's school physician and health officer. He helped spearhead the creation of the town's recreation complex and served as chairman of the New Ipswich recreation commission for its first few years.

== Personal life and death ==
On June 10, 1931, Cayward married Della Martin at her parent's home in Ferrisburgh, Vermont. They had three children before her death in 1950. Cayward's second wife, Doris Ladd, died in 1960. His third wife was Toini Cotzin. Cayward died on November 28, 1969, in Peterborough, New Hampshire.
