= Kevin Roberson =

Kevin Roberson may refer to:

- Kevin Roberson (baseball)
- Kevin Roberson (basketball)
