= 2005 America East men's basketball tournament =

- Classification: Division I
- Season: 2004–05
- Champions: Vermont (3rd title)
- Winning coach: Tom Brennan (3rd title)
- MVP: Taylor Coppenrath (Vermont)

2004–05 America East Conference men's basketball standings
	Conf.				Overall
Team	W		L	PCT	W		L	PCT
Vermont †	16	–	2	.889	25	–	7	.781
Northeastern	15	–	3	.833	21	–	10	.677
Boston University	14	–	4	.778	20	–	9	.690
Albany	9	–	9	.500	13	–	15	.464
Binghamton	8	–	10	.444	12	–	17	.414
Maine	8	–	10	.444	14	–	15	.483
Stony Brook	6	–	12	.333	12	–	17	.414
New Hampshire	5	–	13	.278	9	–	19	.321
UMBC	5	–	13	.278	11	–	18	.379
Hartford	4	–	14	.222	8	–	20	.286
† 2005 America East tournament winner

The 2005 America East men's basketball tournament was held from March 4–6 at the Binghamton University Events Center. The final was held on March 12, at Patrick Gym on the campus of the University of Vermont. Vermont gained its third consecutive berth to the NCAA tournament with its win over Northeastern. Vermont was given the 13th seed in the Austin Regional of the NCAA Tournament and lost in the second round to Michigan State 72–61, after upsetting #4 Syracuse 60–57 in overtime. Both Boston University and Northeastern gained a bid to the NIT and lost in the first round to Georgetown and Memphis respectively.

== Bracket and Results ==
First round Friday, March 4
8	New Hampshire	73
9	UMBC	78
7	Stony Brook	66
10	Hartford	46

Quarterfinals; Saturday, March 5
1	Vermont	76
9	UMBC	61
4	Albany	70
5	Binghamton	76
2	Northeastern	90
7	Stony Brook	79
3	Boston University	45
6	Maine	47

Semifinals; Sunday, March 6
1	Vermont	76
5	Binghamton	65
2	Northeastern	86
6	Maine	73

Final; Monday, March 12
1	Vermont	80
2	Northeastern	57

== See also ==
- America East Conference
