= Mary Gray Peck =

American journalist, suffragist, and clubwoman (1867–1957)

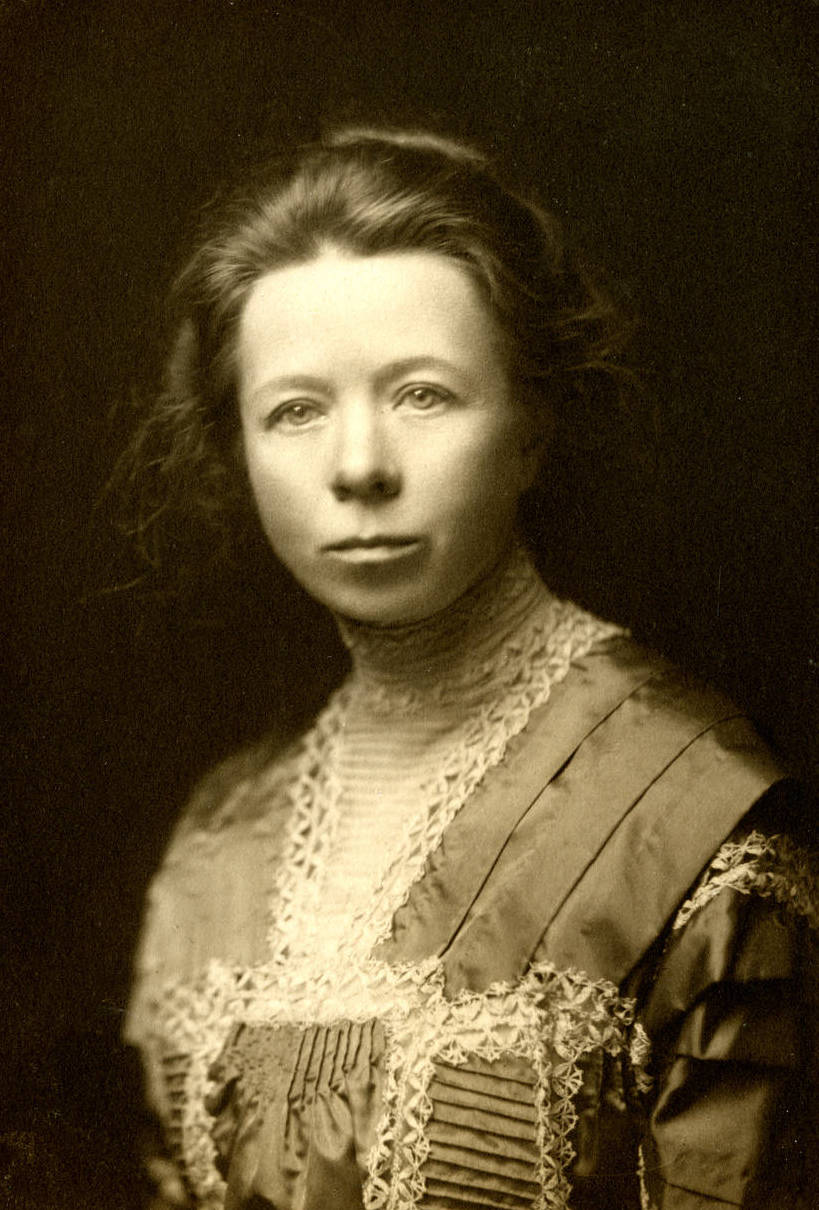
- Mary Gray Peck between 1895 and 1909
- Born: October 21, 1867; Seneca Castle
- Died: January 11, 1957; Jenkintown
- Occupations: Journalist; educator; suffragist; clubwoman

Mary Gray Peck (October 21, 1867 – January 11, 1957) was an American journalist, educator, suffragist, and clubwoman. She was interested in economic and industrial problems of women, and investigated labor conditions in Europe and the United States. Born in New York, she studied at Elmira College, University of Minnesota, and University of Cambridge before becoming an Assistant Professor of English at the University of Minnesota. Later, she became associated with the General Federation of Women's Clubs, College Equal Suffrage League, National American Woman Suffrage Association, Women's Trade Union League, Woman Suffrage Party, and the Modern Language Association. Peck was a delegate at the Sixth Conference of the International Woman Suffrage Alliance in Stockholm, 1911.

== Early years and education ==
Mary Gray Peck was born in Seneca Castle, Ontario County, New York, October 21, 1867. She was a daughter of Henry J. and Mary Diantha (Gray) Peck. Peck graduated from Elmira College, (BA degree, 1889). She did post-graduate work in philology at the University of Minnesota. At University of Cambridge, England, she did graduate work in Old English and Middle English.

== Career ==
Peck served as Assistant Professor of English, at the University of Minnesota, for eight years. She resigned in 1909 to go into suffrage work and journalism. She served as chair of the Drama Sub-Committee of the Committee on Literature and Library Extension in the General Federation of Women's Clubs. She was a Charter member of the College Equal Suffrage League, University of Minnesota. Peck served as Headquarters secretary of the National American Woman Suffrage Association, 1909–10, in New York City. She was a Fraternal delegate from the Women's Trade Union League to Sixth Conference of the International Woman Suffrage Alliance in Stockholm, 1911. She was the Press chair of Ohio Woman Suffrage Association during the campaign of 1912 for the woman suffrage amendment to the new Constitution.

Peck served as special correspondent from the International Suffrage Congress, 1911, for the Boston Evening Transcript and other papers. As a journalist, she contributed to various industrial and academic periodicals, magazines, and newspapers research articles, original investigations, fiction and verse. In religion, she was liberal.

Her affiliations included membership in Gamma Phi Beta sorority; National Women's Trade Union League; Woman Suffrage Party; Geneva Political Equality Club; Chicago Women's City Club; American Woman Suffrage Association; Modern Language Association; University of Minnesota Alumna Association; and the Drama League of America.

Peck died January 11, 1957, at Jenkintown, Pennsylvania, in the home of a niece, Mrs. James F. Koehler, having resided there since 1953. She was buried at Whitney Cemetery, Seneca.

== Selected works ==
- Germelshausen; a drama in four acts by M.G. Peck, Carl Schlenker, Frances B. Potter., 1904
- The rise of the woman suffrage party, 1911
- Outline study course in modern drama beginning with the 19th century, 1912
- Women in the making of America, 1940
- Carrie Chapman Catt : a biography, 1944
