= Muhammad El-Amin =

American basketball player (born 1987)

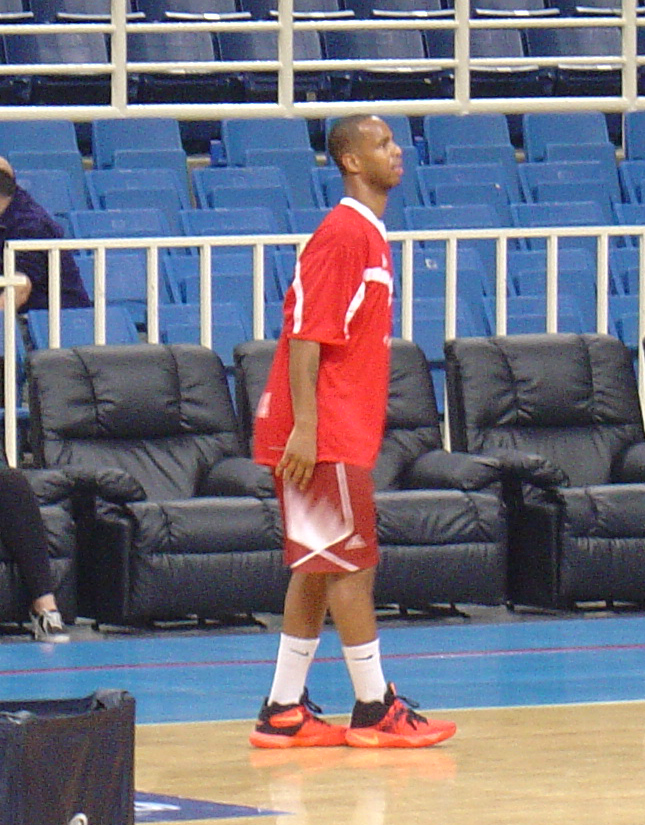
- El-Amin with Nea Kifissia in 2016

Personal information
- Born: July 25, 1987 (age 39) Lansing, Michigan, U.S.
- Listed height: 6 ft 5 in (1.96 m)
- Listed weight: 210 lb (95 kg)

Career information
- High school: Holt (Holt, Michigan)
- College: Lansing CC (2006–2008); Stony Brook (2008–2010)
- NBA draft: 2010: undrafted
- Playing career: 2010–2019
- Position: Shooting guard

Career history
- 2010–2011: PVSK Panthers
- 2011–2012: Albacomp
- 2012–2013: FCM Ferentino
- 2013: Maccabi Kiryat Gat
- 2013–2014: Körmend
- 2014–2015: Apollon Patras
- 2015: Juvecaserta Basket
- 2015–2016: Nea Kifissia
- 2016: Al Sadd Doha
- 2016–2017: Kymis
- 2017: Atenas de Córdoba
- 2017–2018: Soproni KC
- 2018–2019: Qatar SC
- 2019: Panionios

Career highlights
- Hungarian League champion (2013); Hungarian Cup champion (2013); AP honorable mention All-American (2010); America East Player of the Year (2010); First-team All-America East (2010); Second-team All-America East (2009)

Muhammad El-Amin (born July 25, 1987) is an American former professional basketball player. Until his arrest in May 2024, El-Amin coached high school basketball in Holt, Michigan and 8th grade basketball at MacDonald Middle School in East Lansing, Michigan.

== Early life ==
El-Amin grew up in Ingham County, Michigan and attended Holt High School from 2002 to 2006. His freshman and sophomore years were spent at the junior varsity level, and El-Amin did not appear to have a chance at playing college basketball. Aided by a four-inch growth spurt between his sophomore and junior seasons, coupled with hard work in the gym, he found himself as a starter on Holt's competitive varsity squad. He then led Holt to a 26–2 record and state championship victory during his senior season, registering 18 points, 11 rebounds and three steals in the game.

== College career ==
El-Amin was slated to attend the University of Detroit, an NCAA Division I school, and play for the Detroit Titans men's basketball team. However, the Detroit coaching staff changed during El-Amin's senior year and he was told they were no longer interested in him playing for them. After enrolling at Division II Ferris State University, El-Amin left after just a few weeks at the school. He then played at local Lansing Community College for two years and was named a junior college All-American in 2007–08.

Through his high school coach's connections, Stony Brook University head coach Steve Pikiell gave El-Amin an opportunity to play for the Seawolves after his community college career, and El-Amin took full advantage. In both seasons he played for Stony Brook he led the team in scoring while averaging 15.7 and 16.7 points per game in his junior and senior years, respectively. El-Amin was a Second Team All-America East Conference selection in 2008–09 and then a First Team All-Conference selection in 2009–10. In his senior year, he scored a school Division I record 517 points while leading Stony Brook to its first ever regular season conference title as well as their first ever National Invitation Tournament appearance. He was named the 2010 America East Player of the Year, becoming Stony Brook's first player to win that award. In two seasons at Stony Brook, El-Amin scored 971 points.

== Professional career ==
El-Amin signed a contract with PVSK Panthers in Hungary after going unselected in the 2010 NBA draft. In his lone season with the team he averaged 22 points per game. His career then took him to Maccabi Kiryat Gat in Israel, Alba Fehérvár in Hungary, FCM Ferentino in Italy, and Körmend in Hungary again as of 2013–14. On November 1, 2013 he was selected in the fourth round (57th overall) of the 2013 NBA Development League Draft by the Los Angeles D-Fenders but was waived two weeks later.

In September 2014, El-Amin signed with Apollon Patras in Greece.

On July 30, 2015, he signed with Juvecaserta Basket of the Italian Serie A.

In December 2015 El-Amin signed with Nea Kifissia of the Greek League. On May 4, 2016, he moved to Al Sadd Doha for the remainder of the season.

On August 7, 2016, he signed with Kymis of the Greek League. He left Kymis after appearing in fifteen games. On February 16, 2017, he signed with Atenas de Córdoba of the Liga Nacional de Básquet. On March 17, 2017, he parted ways with Atenas after appearing in seven games.

On November 8, 2017, he signed with Hungarian club Soproni KC.

He currently plays for Lansing Pharaohs as part of The Basketball League.

== Arrest and criminal charges ==
In May 2024, El-Amin was arrested and charged with multiple felonies. He was arraigned in 54-A District Court on one count of child sexually abusive activity, two counts of computers-internet-communicating with another to commit a crime, and one count of accosting children for immoral purposes.
