= Howard A. Prentice =

American basketball player and coach (1906–1976)

Biographical details
- Born: April 27, 1906; Manchester, Vermont, U.S.
- Died: March 16, 1976 (aged 69); Burlington, Vermont, U.S.
- Education: University of Vermont; New York University; Columbia University

Playing career

Basketball
- 1925–1928: Vermont

Coaching career (HC unless noted)

Men's basketball
- 1930–1931: Vermont

Men's ice hockey
- 1931–1932: Vermont

Administrative career (AD unless noted)
- 1928–1942: Vermont

Head coaching record
- Overall: 4–13

Howard Anderson Prentice (April 27, 1906 – March 16, 1976) was an American athlete and coach at the University of Vermont who was a member of the Vermont Catamounts men's basketball team from 1926 to 1928 and the head of university's physical education department from 1928 to 1942. He then worked as a trade association executive until 1967.

== University of Vermont ==
Prentice was born on April 27, 1906, in Manchester, Vermont, to Robert James and Bertha (Orene) Anderson. He attended the University of Vermont, where he was a forward on the school's basketball team, first baseman on the baseball team, and a long jump specialist for the track team. He was captain of the basketball team during the 1927–28 season. Prentice was inducted into the University of Vermont Athletic Hall of Fame in 1971.

After graduating, Prentice became UVM's athletic director and director of physical education. He was head coach of the Vermont Catamounts men's basketball team during the 1930–31 season and compiled a 4–13 record. He stepped down after one season to focus on his work as director of physical education, which included supervising all intramural sports. However, that November, he was appointed men's ice hockey coach following the resignation of Hymen Abraham. The program was disbanded at the end of the season. From 1936 to 1937, he was UVM's freshman baseball team.

Prentice earned his Master of Arts from New York University in 1935 and his Doctor of Education from Columbia University in 1940.

== Trade association work ==
During World War II, Prentice served in the United States Coast Guard. In 1946, he moved to Washington, D.C., where he worked as the vice president and secretary of the Corn Industries Research Foundation. In 1955, he became executive vice president and treasurer of the Proprietary Association. In 1961, he became president and chairman of the Therapeutic Research Foundation. He retired from both positions in 1967, but continued to work part-time as a consultant.

== Personal life and death ==
On July 2, 1932, Prentice married Hedelind Elizabeth Welch. They had two children. Prentice died on March 16, 1976, in Burlington, Vermont from pneumonia.
