= Peter Salzberg =

American basketball coach

Biographical details
- Education: Columbia

Coaching career (HC unless noted)
- 1967–1972: Columbia (freshmen)
- 1972–1981: Vermont

Head coaching record
- Overall: 105-128

Peter Salzberg is an American former college basketball coach and was the head men's basketball coach at Vermont from 1972 to 1981.

== Early career ==
After a playing both basketball and golf at Columbia, Salzberg worked for the Associated Press for two years before being hired as the Columbia freshman basketball team coach by Jack Rohan in 1967. Salzberg also served as the university's golf coach and assistant to the director of athletics during his tenure at his alma mater. During the crisis on Columnbia's campus in 1968, Salzberg joined other young faculty and staff as peacekeepers between protesters, and Salzberg documented the experience on campus as Assistant Editor of "Six Weeks that Shook Mornignside" - a special edition of the alumni magazine consisting of collected documents and photographs, and with effort "to be more reasonable, comprehensive, and non-partisan than most."

== Head coaching career ==
In 1972, Salzberg was hired as the head men's basketball coach at Vermont, where he would coach for nine years, ending with an overall record of 105-128.

Salzberg remains ranked fifth all time at Vermont in wins and in win/loss percentage. His tenure included coming in second in line for the New England Coach of the Year in 1975 and the historic upset in 1977 of Vermont over The Ohio State Buckeyes, 7 of whose players were drafted into the NBA.

Salzberg resigned from the position after nine seasons, and was replaced by his assistant, Bill Whitmore.

== Head coaching record ==
=== College ===
Record table
Season	Team	Overall	Conference	Standing	Postseason
Vermont (Yankee/America East) (1972–1981)
1972–73	Vermont	8-16	2-10	6th	
1973–74	Vermont	9-17	3-9	5th	
1974–75	Vermont	16-10	8-4	3rd	
1975–76	Vermont	15-10	6-6	4th	
1976–77	Vermont	9-16	N/A		
1977–78	Vermont	11-15	N/A		
1978–79	Vermont	9-17	N/A		
1979–80	Vermont	12-15	N/A	7th	
1980–81	Vermont	16-12	N/A	3rd	
Vermont:		105-128	19-29		
Total:		105-128			
