= Bill Whitmore =

American college basketball coach

Current position
- Record: 45–94

Biographical details
- Education: St. Bonaventure

Coaching career (HC unless noted)
- 1977–1981: Vermont (asst.)
- 1981–1986: Vermont
- 1986–1989: St. Bonaventure (asst.)

Head coaching record
- Overall: 45–94

Bill Whitmore is an American former college basketball coach and was the head men's basketball coach at Vermont from 1981 to 1986.

== Coaching career ==
After graduation from St. Bonaventure, Whitmore coached a state championship high school basketball team in New York before accepting a position as an assistant coach at Vermont under Peter Salzberg. After Salzberg stepped down before the 1981 season, Whitmore was elevated to head coach. His teams failed to win over 10 games in his five years at the helm. Whitmore stepped down, and was replaced by Tom Brennan.

Whitmore is known for giving Stan Van Gundy his first coaching job, while also offering John Calipari his first paid coaching job, before Calipari had a change of heart and returned to Kansas to continue to work under Larry Brown.

== Personal ==
After coaching, Whitmore has served with great success in various athletic administration roles at the high school level. Currently, he is a consultant for athletic directors around the country. He was the athletic director at five different schools, including Crystal Springs Upland School (Hillsborough) (CA) Bedford High School in New Hampshire. Whitmore's son Nick has been a championship prep school coach and college assistant coach San Francisco, and is currently an assistant coach at the University of Wyoming.

== Head coaching record ==
=== College ===
Record table
Season	Team	Overall	Conference	Standing	Postseason
Vermont (America East Conference) (1981–1986)
1981-82	Vermont	10-16	2-8	7th	
1982-83	Vermont	10-19	3-7	8th	
1983-84	Vermont	7-21	3-11	7th	
1984-85	Vermont	9-19	5-11	6th	
1985-86	Vermont	9-19	5-13	9th	
Vermont:		45-94	18-50		
Total:		45-94			
