= Matt Johnson (basketball) =

American basketball player and coach

Personal information
- Born: circa 1969 (age 56–57)

Career information
- High school: BFA-St. Albans (St. Albans, Vermont)
- College: Vermont (1987–1991)
- NBA draft: 1991: undrafted
- Playing career: 1994–1995
- Position: Small forward

Career history

Playing
- 1994–1995: Queen's Strongbow

Coaching
- 1992–1993: Proctor HS
- 1993–1994: Vermont (assistant)
- 1997–1999: Peoples Academy (assistant)
- 2002–2016: Burlington HS
- 2017–present: Jefferson County HS

Career highlights
- North Atlantic Player of the Year (1991); First-team All-North Atlantic (1991)

Matthew Johnson (born circa 1969) is an American basketball coach and former player best known for his collegiate playing career at the University of Vermont from 1987 to 1991. His professional basketball career was a one-year stint in Ireland in 1994–95. He served as the head boys' basketball coach at Burlington High School in Burlington, Vermont from 2002–2016, winning four Vermont Division I boys' basketball championships, and an overall record of 265–61. He was named head boys' basketball coach at Jefferson County High School in Dandridge, Tennessee in 2017.

== High school career ==
Matt Johnson attended Bellows Free Academy, St. Albans in St. Albans, Vermont. In his four-year prep career he scored 2,121 points, which as of January 2010 is the second-highest total in state history behind Bruce Dalrymple's 2,477. The three-point field goal line was instituted his senior season. At the end of the year he was named the 1987 Vermont High School Athlete of the Year. Despite this, Johnson was lightly recruited by colleges.

== College career ==
One college that did pursue Johnson was his home state's University of Vermont, an NCAA Division I school who was a member of the North Atlantic Conference (now known as the America East Conference). He accepted an athletic scholarship to play for the Catamounts. In his freshman season he averaged a modest 4.5 points per game in limited action. Johnson began progressing during his sophomore season in 1988–89 and averaged over 16 points per game in his final six games of that season. It was in his junior season that he began to make a name for himself. Johnson averaged 14.3 points per game, good for seventh in the conference, and he came through in crunch time during the North Atlantic Conference tournament. He was named to the All-NAC Tournament Team, although Vermont lost in their first-ever championship match. In 1990–91, Johnson's senior season at Vermont, he averaged a conference-best 20.7 points per game, scored a then-school single season record 580 points, and tallied 40 or more points three different times. In the North Atlantic Conference's 22-year existence at that point, he became the first player to be named the NAC Player of the Week four straight weeks. Johnson led the Catamounts to their first winning season in 10 years and was named not only a first team all-conference performer, but also became Vermont's first North Atlantic Conference Player of the Year. At the time of his graduation his 1,264 points ranked 10th in school history.

== Post-college ==
After graduating in 1991, Johnson spent the 1992–93 year as Proctor High School's head boys' basketball coach and was named the Marble Valley League Coach of the Year. He then spent the 1993–94 year as an assistant coach for his collegiate alma mater before spending one season playing professional basketball in Ireland for Queen's Strongbow. Upon returning home to the United States, Johnson earned a Master's in Public Administration at San Diego State University in 1997, then moved back to Vermont. From 1997 to 1999 he was an assistant coach at Peoples Academy in Morrisville, Vermont. In 2002, Johnson became the head boys' basketball coach at Burlington High School, where he coached until 2016, winning four state titles with an overall record of 265–61 with the Seahorses. Johnson also worked as a teacher and counselor at a juvenile correctional facility. He and his wife, Sarah, have two daughters, Haley and Madison and one son, Nick. Johnson was inducted into the University of Vermont Hall of Fame in 2001.
