= Eddie Benton =

American basketball player and coach

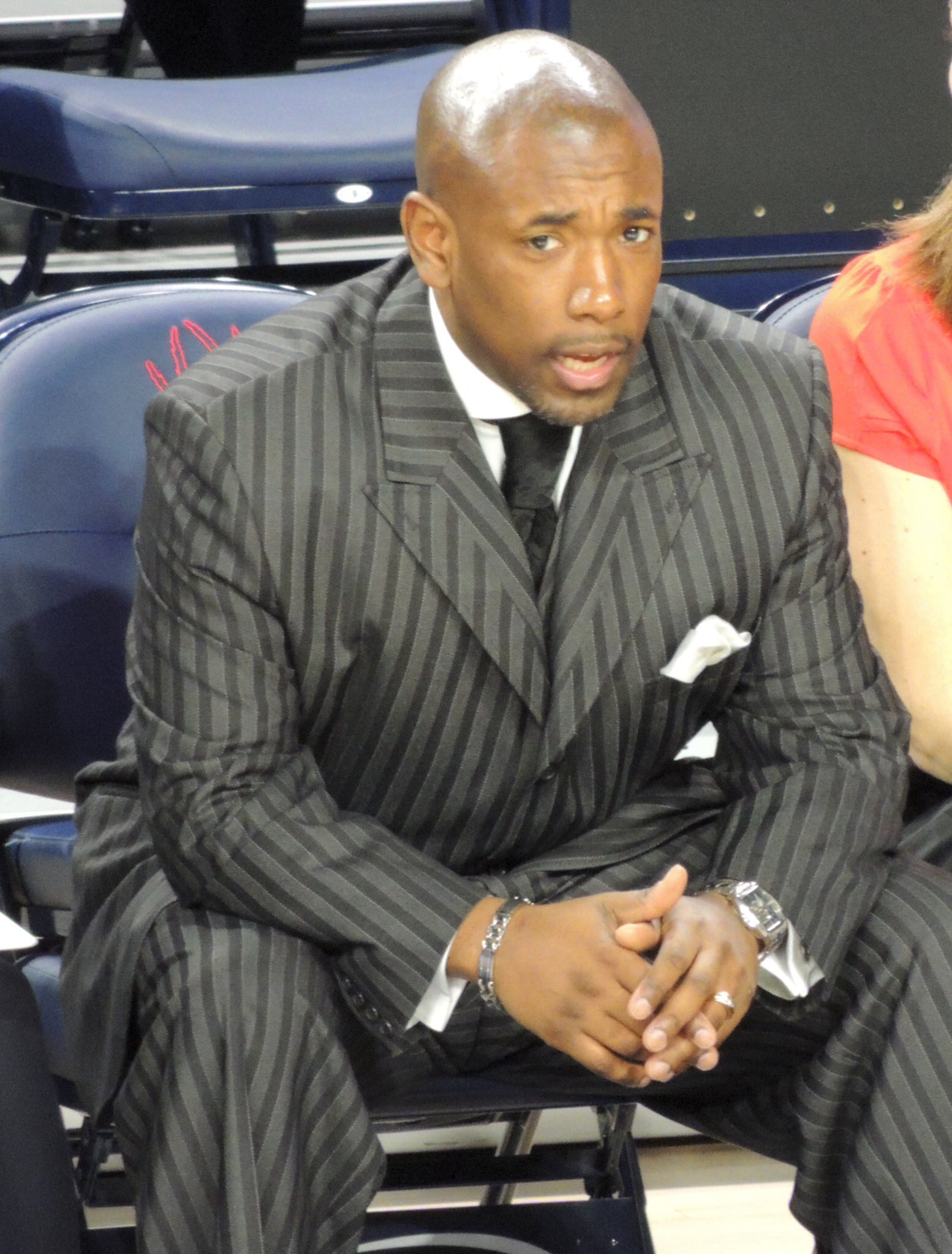
- Benton coaching in 2014

Robert Morris Colonials
- Title: Assistant coach
- League: Horizon League

Personal information
- Born: February 16, 1975 (age 51)
- Listed height: 5 ft 11 in (1.80 m)
- Listed weight: 215 lb (98 kg)

Career information
- High school: Perry Traditional Academy (Pittsburgh, Pennsylvania)
- College: Vermont (1992–1996)
- NBA draft: 1996: undrafted
- Playing career: 1996–1999
- Position: Point guard
- Coaching career: 1999–present

Career history

Playing
- 1996–1997: Grand Rapids Hoops

Career highlights
- As player: Frances Pomeroy Naismith Award (1996); 4× First-team All-North Atlantic (1993–1996); North Atlantic Rookie of the Year (1993); No. 10 retired by Vermont Catamounts; As head coach: 2× AMCC Coach of the Year (2011, 2012)

Eddie Benton, Jr. (born February 16, 1975) is an American college women's basketball coach, currently serving as an assistant coach for the Robert Morris women's basketball team. He is best known for his collegiate playing career at the University of Vermont between 1992 and 1996. In his senior season he was named the Frances Pomeroy Naismith Award winner, given annually to the best college senior player in the country who is 6 ft 0 in (1.83 m) or shorter. Benton then had a short-lived professional career before becoming a college coach.

== Playing career ==
=== High school ===
Benton, a Pittsburgh, Pennsylvania native, attended Perry Traditional Academy from 1988 to 1992. He was the team's sixth man during his sophomore and junior seasons before becoming the starting point guard as a senior in 1991–92. Benton helped the Perry Commodores to their school's first state title during his junior year. In his final year, the Pittsburgh Post-Gazette "Fabulous Five" team after also being named an all-City League player.

=== College ===
Benton continued his basketball career at the University of Vermont; he went on to have the most decorated career in Vermont's program's history during his tenure. He scored a still-standing school record 2,474 points, including a record 54-point game against Drexel on January 29, 1994. His point total was the second-highest in America East Conference history, and for his career he averaged 23.8 points per game. In three of his four seasons, Benton finished in the top 12 nationally. Benton scored his 1,000th career point during his sophomore season and became only the third NCAA Division I men's basketball player ever to record 1,000 points before his 19th birthday (others include LSU's Shaquille O'Neal and Duke's Mike Gminski). He was named a First Team All-America East Conference performer in all four seasons, becoming just the third player in conference history to achieve that. In 1995–96 Benton won the Frances Pomeroy Naismith Award as the best senior player under 6-feet tall (he is 5'11"). At the time of Benton's graduation in 1996, he held 15 different offensive category school records, including career field goals, free throws, three-pointers and scoring average. He also recorded 458 assists, the third-highest total in Vermont history as of his graduation.

=== Professional ===
Benton went undrafted in the 1996 NBA draft. He spent the 1996–97 season playing in the Continental Basketball Association for the Grand Rapids Hoops. Over the following two seasons he played internationally in leagues in Israel, the Netherlands, and Venezuela.

== Coaching career ==
After his short-lived professional career, Benton returned to the United States and got into coaching. His first job came in 1999 for the men's team at La Roche College, a Division III school in his native Pittsburgh. Staying local, he then spent three seasons with the men's program at Robert Morris University. In 2004, La Roche hired Benton as the head women's basketball coach, where he would stay for eight years and compile 108 overall wins. He led La Roche to two consecutive Allegheny Mountain Collegiate Conference (AMCC) championships, back-to-back Division III Tournament appearances, and in 2012 was named the AMCC Coach of the Year. Benton spent the 2012–13 season as an assistant for the women's team at Saint Francis University before landing at Duquesne University in 2013–14. From 2013 to 2017, Benton served as an assistant coach for the women's team at Duquesne. After serving the 2017–18 season as an assistant coach of the women's basketball team at the University of Cincinnati, Benton accepted an assistant coaching position with Brown. He stayed with them for three seasons before accepting an assistant coach position at Mississippi State to work under head coach Nikki McCray.

In 2022, Benton became the head girls basketball coach at Oakland Catholic High School in his hometown of Pittsburgh.

On April 8, 2024, he was named an assistant coach for the Robert Morris women's basketball team, marking his return to the school, having been an assistant coach for the school's men's basketball team from 2001–2004.

== See also ==
- List of NCAA Division I men's basketball career free throw scoring leaders
