= Seneca Castle, New York =

- Hamlet
- Location within New York Location within the United States
- Coordinates: 42°53′13″N 77°05′46″W
- Country: United States
- State: New York
- County: Ontario
- Elevation: 761 ft (232 m)
- Time zone: UTC-5 (Eastern (EST))
  - Summer (DST): UTC-4 (EDT)
- ZIP code: 14547
- Area code: 585
- GNIS feature ID: 964824

Seneca Castle is a hamlet in Ontario County, New York, United States. The community is 5.8 miles (9.3 km) west-northwest of Geneva. Seneca Castle has a post office with ZIP code 14547.

== Notable person ==
- Mary Gray Peck (1867–1957), journalist, suffragist, and clubwoman

== See also ==
Kanadaseaga
