= Rufus Harris =

American basketball player

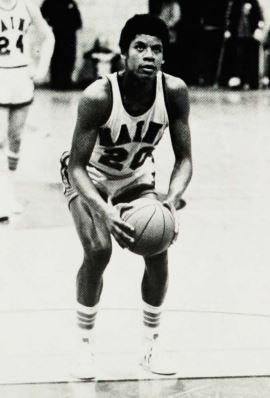
- Harris as a freshman at Maine

Personal information
- Born: April 15, 1957 (age 69) La Grange, Illinois, U.S.
- Listed height: 6 ft 4 in (1.93 m)
- Listed weight: 190 lb (86 kg)

Career information
- High school: Framingham South (Framingham, Massachusetts)
- College: Maine (1976–1980)
- NBA draft: 1980: 5th round, 115th overall pick
- Drafted by: Boston Celtics
- Position: Small forward

Career history
- 1980–1982: Maine Lumberjacks
- 1982–1983: Lancaster Lightning
- 1986: Magnolia Cheese Makers

Career highlights
- ECAC North co-Player of the Year (1980); No. 20 retired by Maine Black Bears
- Stats at Basketball Reference

Rufus D. Harris is a retired American professional basketball player. He was the America East Conference co-Player of the Year as a senior in 1979–80 while playing for the University of Maine. After graduating, Harris was selected in the 1980 NBA draft by the Boston Celtics, although he never played in the National Basketball Association. Instead, he carved a professional career in both the Continental Basketball Association and international leagues. Harris played from 1980 to 1983 in the CBA, for the Maine Lumberjacks and Lancaster Lightning. In 88 CBA games he averaged 18.8 points per game.

While playing for the Maine Black Bears between 1976–77 and 1979–80, Harris scored a still-standing school record 2,206 points. His 718 total points and 25.6 per game average in 1979–80 are both single season records as well.

Rufus is the nephew of Larry Garron, a well known former Boston Patriots running back.

== Legal troubles ==
On December 6, 2016, Harris was arrested in Framingham, Massachusetts and charged with disorderly conduct after police say he danced in the middle of a busy intersection and was "yelling for no lawful purpose" as music played from his cell phone. After representing himself in court the case was reviewed and dismissed for $20 in court costs.
