= Kevin Roberson (basketball) =

American basketball player

Personal information
- Born: October 25, 1970
- Died: May 8, 1993 (aged 22) Buffalo, New York, U.S.
- Listed height: 6 ft 8 in (2.03 m)
- Listed weight: 195 lb (88 kg)

Career information
- High school: Hutchinson Tech (Buffalo, New York)
- College: Vermont (1988–1992)
- NBA draft: 1992: undrafted
- Position: Center

Career highlights
- North Atlantic Player of the Year (1992); 2× First-team All-North Atlantic (1991, 1992); No. 33 retired by Vermont Catamounts

Kevin A. Roberson (October 25, 1970 – May 8, 1993) was an American basketball player known for his collegiate playing career at the University of Vermont from 1988 to 1992. He etched himself into the National Collegiate Athletic Association (NCAA) record book for blocks; Roberson's 409 career blocks was the third-highest total in Division I history at the time of his graduation, and as of the 2024–25 season it remains the 22nd highest. Five different times he recorded 10 or more blocks in a single game, including a career-high 13 against New Hampshire on January 9, 1992. Roberson also scored 1,503 points and grabbed 1,054 rebounds, which were second and first in school history, respectively, at the time of his graduation. Roberson recorded five triple-doubles in his career as well. In his junior and senior seasons he was a two-time All-North Atlantic Conference (NAC) First Team selection, and his senior year in 1991–92 saw him be named the NAC Player of the Year. He averaged 18 points and 11.2 rebounds en route to the award.

== Death and legacy ==
Roberson went undrafted in the 1992 NBA draft, and less than a year after graduating from the University of Vermont, he was killed in a car accident in his hometown of Buffalo, New York on May 8, 1993. He and his sister, Michelle, were hit head-on in an intersection by a drunk driver. Basketball fans throughout the region were stunned. Roberson's coach, Tom Brennan, said "Looking back, what really sticks out is the reaction of everyone to Kevin and I mean everyone. As brilliant as Kevin's career was; as electric a player as he was; everyone talked about Kevin as a person."

Roberson was immediately inducted into the University of Vermont Hall of Fame in 1993. The conference player of the year award was later renamed the "Kevin Roberson America East Conference Men's Basketball Player of the Year." Since fall 1993, there has been an annual Kevin Roberson 5K Memorial Run/Walk dedicated to him. Roberson's jersey number (33) also became the first men's basketball number ever retired by the school.

== See also ==
- List of NCAA Division I men's basketball players with 13 or more blocks in a game
- List of NCAA Division I men's basketball career blocks leaders
- List of NCAA Division I basketball career triple-doubles leaders
