= Missisquoi Valley Union Middle/High School =

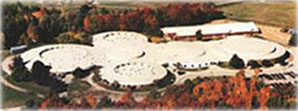

Location
- 175 Thunderbird Drive; Swanton, Vermont 05488; U.S. 44°55′42″N 73°06′06″W

Information
- Type: Public High School
- Established: 1970
- School district: Missisquoi Valley School District
- Superintendent: Julie Regimbal
- CEEB code: 460170
- Principal: Dan Palmer
- Teaching staff: 83.30 (FTE)
- Grades: 7-12
- Enrollment: 741 (2023-2024)
- Student to teacher ratio: 8.90
- Colors: Blue & White
- Mascot: Thunderbird
- Nickname: T-Birds
- Website: http://mvuschool.org

Missisquoi Valley Union (MVU) is a middle and high school, grades 7–12, located in Swanton, Vermont, United States. MVU's campus contains two main buildings. The school serves the communities of Swanton, Highgate, and Franklin. Students from Sheldon and Alburgh are given the choice to attend MVU or another surrounding school. There were 902 students and 94 teachers for the 2014–2015 school year. MVU is located just off exit 21 of I-89.

== Infrastructure ==
Misssiquoi Valley Union's main/original building was constructed in an open design format with five circular self-contained "pods" to house the more than 1000 expected students. On campus, there are four soccer fields, two baseball fields, three softball fields, a track, and a football field. There is also an agricultural building that houses cows, pigs, sheep, donkeys, etc., that are raised by the students. The beef is used for lunch at the school. In the building there is a gym that is used for basketball and volleyball. The building also contains the Trahan Theater which is used to host the school's annual Skit Nite and Musical. It is also used for concerts, award ceremonies and assemblies. The gym is also used for assemblies.

== Athletics ==
The school mascot is the Thunderbird and blue and white are the school colors. The school competes in the following sports

=== Fall Sports ===
- Field Hockey
- Girls Soccer
- Boys Soccer
- Football
- Cross Country
- Boys Golf
- Girls Golf
- Girls Volleyball
- Boys Volleyball

=== Winter Sports ===
- Boys Basketball
- Girls Basketball
- Cheer leading
- Dance Team
- Girls Ice Hockey
- Boys Ice Hockey
- Indoor Track

=== Spring Sports ===
- Softball
- Baseball
- Girls Golf
- Boys Golf
- Outdoor Track

Each year in the fall any senior girls can participate in the Powder Puff football game against the long time rival BFA St. Albans. The game raises money for kids with cancer.

=== MVU Football ===
Despite being one of the largest high schools in the state of Vermont, Missisquoi Valley Union High School did not field a football team of any variety until 2014. Prior to 2014, several attempts were made to obtain funding through the school's budget, but the motion was voted down each time...most recently in 2016. As a result, the team continued on their own and raised the money themselves in order to fund the program. In 2014, the program received a $10,000 grant from the Vermont chapter of the National Football Foundation as well as donated gear from Middlebury College and the New England Patriots among other organizations. After a lot of hard work and determination, the MVU Thunderbirds made their debut in the fall 2014 season on a JV schedule and finished with a 5–2 record. They remained on a JV schedule for the 2015 season as well, also finishing with a 5–2 record.

The 2016 season marked the varsity debut of the MVU Thunderbird football program. Even though the rest of the athletic programs at MVU play in Division 1 or 2, the football program began its varsity journey in Division 3. An eventual move up to Division 2 or 1 is expected once the team is able to gain more varsity experience. Unfortunately, the MVU Thunderbirds finished their inaugural season with an 0–7 record and were outscored 313–48. The Thunderbirds won their first game as a varsity program on October 21, 2017, when they beat their rivals at BFA Fairfax 54–24.

== Music and Drama ==
Missisquoi has held a musical and Skit Nite annually since its first year of operation. For Skit Nite each class; freshmen, sophomores, juniors, and seniors, create an original play that is no more than half an hour long. All classes compete against each other for victory and bragging rights. There are two nights to perform for an audience and graduates serve as judges to determine the winner. However the judges do not know any of the students so there is no bias. MVU has auditions for the musical in November and practices from January to the beginning of April, at which time the musical is held. Grades 7-12 may participate.

- 2026 - Anastasia
- 2025 - Once Upon a Mattress
- 2024 - Footloose
- 2023 - Newsies
- 2022 - Mary Poppins
- 2019 - The Addams Family
- 2018 - Big Fish
- 2017 - Young Frankenstein
- 2016 - The Little Mermaid
- 2015 - Shrek the Musical
- 2014 - Annie
- 2013 - Singin' in the Rain
- 2012 - The Wizard of Oz
- 2011 - Seussical
- 2010 - Into the Woods
- 2007 - Beauty and the Beast
- 2006 - The Music Man
- 2005 - Bye Bye Birdie
- 2004 - Once Upon a Mattress
- 2003 - Leader of the Pack
- 2002 - Godspell
- 2001 - Our Town
- 2000 - Man of La Mancha
- 1999 - Brigadoon
- 1998 - The Fantasticks
- 1997 - Barnum
- 1996 - Guys and Dolls
- 1995 - Jesus Christ Superstar
- 1994 - Oklahoma!
- 1993 - Little Shop of Horrors
- 1992 - The Wizard of Oz
- 1991 - Into the Woods
- 1990 - Starmites
- 1989 - The Pirates of Penzance
- 1988 - Joseph and the Amazing Technicolor Dreamcoat
- 1987 - Oliver!
- 1986 - West Side Story
- 1985 - Godspell
- 1984 - Anything Goes

MVU has a middle school chorus, a high school concert chorus, and Mastersingers, a more advanced high school chorus. MVU also has a middle school band, a middle school string ensemble, a high school concert band, a jazz band, and a wind ensemble, a more advanced high school band. The band director, Aron Garceau from the band Prydein, selects talented students and adults to play in the pit band for the musical. Both the high school concert band and wind ensemble march at the St. Albans Maple Festival at the end of April and the Memorial Day parades at the surrounding towns of Swanton, Highgate, and Franklin on Memorial Day. The Vermont All State Music Festival was held at MVU in May 1992 and was held at MVU again in May 2016.

A notable former band director was Brooke Ostrander, who was previously the keyboard/flute player in Wicked Lester, the band that eventually became Kiss.
