= Taylor Coppenrath =

American basketball player (born 1981)

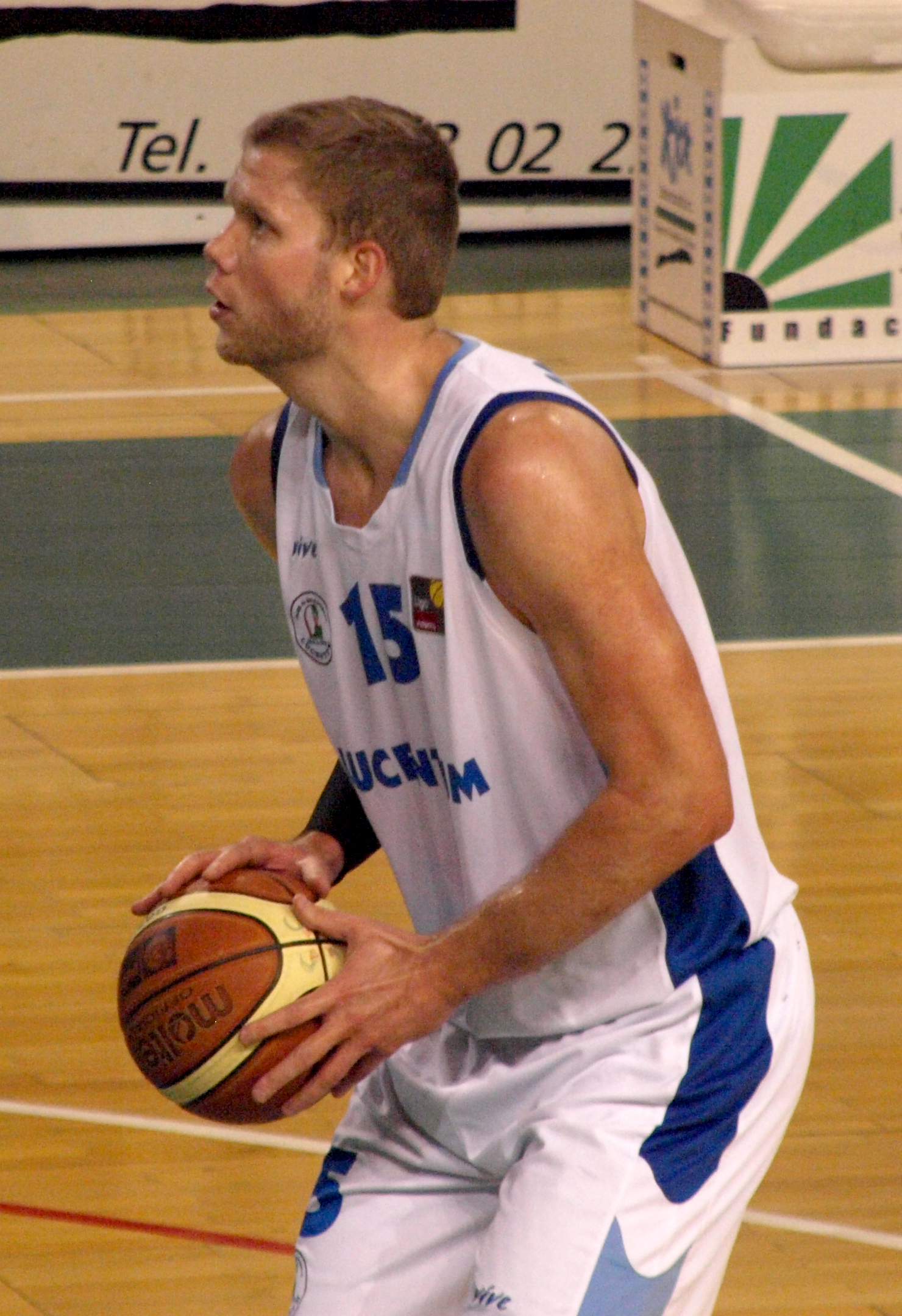

Personal information
- Born: November 8, 1981 (age 44) Barnet, Vermont, U.S.
- Listed height: 6 ft 9.75 in (2.08 m)
- Listed weight: 250 lb (113 kg)

Career information
- High school: St. Johnsbury Academy (St. Johnsbury, Vermont)
- College: Vermont (2001–2005)
- NBA draft: 2005: undrafted
- Playing career: 2005–2015
- Position: Center
- Number: 22

Career history
- 2005–2006: AEK Athens
- 2006–2007: Pallacanestro Biella
- 2007–2009: Lucentum Alicante
- 2009–2010: Club Melilla Baloncesto
- 2010–2011: CB Murcia
- 2011–2012: Menorca Bàsquet
- 2012–2013: Lucentum Alicante
- 2013–2015: Ford Burgos

Career highlights
- 3× AP Honorable mention All-American (2003–2005); 3× America East Player of the Year (2003–2005); 3× First-team All-America East (2003–2005); America East Rookie of the Year (2002); 2× America East tournament MVP (2004, 2005); No. 22 retired by Vermont Catamounts; Vermont Mr. Basketball (2000); Vermont Sports HOF 9th class (2022)

Taylor Burton Coppenrath (born November 8, 1981) is an American former professional basketball player.

== Early life ==
Coppenrath went to high school at St. Johnsbury Academy where he did not play for the varsity basketball team until his junior year. However, he went on to be the 2000 Vermont Player of the Year by Gatorade, the Burlington Free Press and USA Today.

== College career ==
Coppenrath played at University of Vermont from 2001 to 2005. After his redshirt freshman year, he led UVM to three straight America East Conference titles. At the end of his college career, he was Vermont's second all-time leading scorer in total points (2,442) and points per game (21.4). He also ranks the university's all-time leader in field goals made (851), is fifth all-time in rebounding (839) and blocked shots (83). He is one of two players along with Reggie Lewis, to win three America East Conference Player of the Year awards. Coppenrath also matched a record held by Vin Baker with 14 America East Player of the Week awards.

During his junior year, Coppenrath and the Catamounts were in contention for the America East regular season championship when he discovered that his wrist was broken following a loss to Boston University. BU went on to win the regular season crown, but Coppenrath led Vermont over Maine in the conference title game to send UVM to the NCAA tournament. The title game, which was held at UVM's Patrick Gym and televised nationally, was Coppenrath's first game back from the wrist injury. Playing with his wrist wrapped, Coppenrath delivered a 43-point performance and captured the Reggie Lewis Award as the most outstanding player of the conference tournament despite playing only one game in the tourney.

In his senior year, Coppenrath was a finalist for many national awards, including the John Wooden Award for National Player of the Year, the only finalist ever from the America East. That season (2004–2005) was the most successful in Vermont men's basketball history. After capturing the Conference title, the team defeated Syracuse University for its first NCAA tournament victory ever. Coppenrath scored 16 points in the game.

On October 26, 2019, Coppenrath’s number 22 jersey was retired by the University of Vermont, on the same night former teammate T. J. Sorrentine’s number 11 was also retired.

== Professional career ==
After playing with the Boston Celtics Summer League team in 2005, Coppenrath signed with AEK Athens B.C. in Greece for the 2005–06 season. After completing his first season abroad, he played with the Indiana Pacers during Summer League before signing with Pallacanestro Biella in Italian Serie A.

In 2007, Coppenrath signed with CB Lucentum Alicante in the Spanish LEB Oro, where he stayed from 2007 to 2009. Coppenrath finished his career in Spain, with both Melilla Baloncesto in 2009–10, CB Murcia in 2010–11, Menorca Bàsquet in 2011–12, returning to Alicante for the 2012–13 season, where he again helped the team earn promotion to Liga ACB. For the 2013–14 season, Coppenrath signed with Ford Burgos., where he was selected in the All-LEB Oro Team after the 2014–15 season.

In August 2015, Coppenrath announced his retirement after helping teams achieve five promotions to Liga ACB in six seasons.

== Coaching career ==
Coppenrath returned to his alma mater, St. Johnsbury Academy where he served as an assistant coach for the boys' basketball team in addition to teaching math. On July 26, 2017, Coppenrath was announced as the head girls basketball coach at Missisquoi Valley Union Middle/High School in Swanton, Vermont, where he will also serve as a math teacher.

== Euroleague statistics ==
Legend
GP	Games played	GS	Games started	MPG	Minutes per game
FG%	Field-goal percentage	3P%	3-point field-goal percentage	FT%	Free-throw percentage
RPG	Rebounds per game	APG	Assists per game	SPG	Steals per game
BPG	Blocks per game	PPG	Points per game	PIR	Performance index rating
**Bold**	Career high

Year	Team	GP	GS	MPG	FG%	3P%	FT%	RPG	APG	SPG	BPG	PPG	PIR
2005–06	AEK Athens	13	13	28.6	.495	.000	.789	3.6	.5	1.0	.4	11.1	10.9
Career		13	13	28.6	.495	.000	.789	3.6	.5	1.0	.4	11.1	10.9
