= T. J. Sorrentine =

American basketball player and coach (born 1982)

Washington Wizards
- Title: Assistant coach
- League: NBA

Personal information
- Born: July 29, 1982 (age 44) Pawtucket, Rhode Island, U.S.
- Listed height: 5 ft 11 in (1.80 m)
- Listed weight: 185 lb (84 kg)

Career information
- High school: St. Raphael Academy (Pawtucket, Rhode Island)
- College: Vermont (2000–2005)
- NBA draft: 2005: undrafted
- Playing career: 2005–2008
- Position: Point guard

Career history

Playing
- 2005: Basket Trapani
- 2005–2006: Florida Flame
- 2007: Porto
- 2007–2008: Krka

Coaching
- 2008–2011: Brown (assistant)
- 2011–2024: Brown (associate HC)
- 2024–present: Washington Wizards (assistant)

Career highlights
- America East Player of the Year (2002); America East Rookie of the Year (2001); No. 11 retired by Vermont Catamounts

Thomas John "T. J." Sorrentine (born July 29, 1982) an American former basketball player and current associate head coach of the Washington Wizards of the National Basketball Association (NBA). Sorrentine is widely known from his collegiate playing career at Vermont, hitting a three-pointer with 1:10 remaining to help the 13-seed Catamounts defeat fourth-seeded Syracuse 60–57 in overtime in the first round of the 2005 NCAA tournament for the school's first-ever tournament win.

== Playing career ==
Sorrentine starred for St. Raphael Academy under his father, Thomas "Saar" Sorrentine, a legendary Rhode Island high school coach and New England Basketball Hall of Fame inductee. Sorrentine was named the Rhode Island Player of the Year by both Gatorade and USA Today in 2000, after leading St. Raphael's to back-to-back state titles.

In college, Sorrentine played at Vermont under Tom Brennan. During his rookie 000–01 season, he made an immediate impact, leading the team in assists, and finishing second on the team in scoring, earning America East Rookie of the Year honors in the process. A year later in 2002, Sorrentine, along with Taylor Coppenrath and the late Trevor Gaines, helped guide UVM to its first-ever 20-win season and first America East Regular Season title in the process. Sorrentine scored 18.8 points per game and dished out four assists per game to win America East Player of the Year honors, the first Catamount to do so since the 1991–92 season. Sorrentine also earned AP All-American Honorable Mention honors.

Sorrentine broke both his wrists before the start of the 2002–03 season and sat out the entire season as a redshirt. In his absence, the Catamounts went 21–12, winning their first-ever America East Championship, defeating Boston University for a trip to the 2003 NCAA tournament. Returning from injury a year later, the tandem of Sorrentine and Coppenrath combined to bring Vermont to a 22–9 record, another America East Championship, and a trip to the 2004 NCAA tournament, where the Catamounts fell to eventual national champion Connecticut in the first round.

In 2004–05, Sorrentine helped Vermont to its most historic season in school history. Along with Coppenrath and three other seniors, he helped Vermont post a school-record 25 wins, winning the America East regular season and conference titles for its third-straight NCAA appearance. Vermont became just the third team in America East history to win three or more consecutive conference tournament titles.

As a 13-seed, the Catamounts drew Big East Champion Syracuse in the 2005 NCAA tournament in the Worcester region. Sorrentine scored 17 points, including five three-point field goals, one which will remain entrenched in NCAA Tournament lore, as Sorrentine nailed a deep three-pointer with 1:10 left in overtime to put Vermont ahead 59–55 in a 60–57 win. During the game, television commentator Gus Johnson commented that "Sorrentine hit that one from the parking lot." The win over the Orange was the first postseason win in school history and UVM's first-ever over a ranked foe (Syracuse was ranked No. 11). Vermont eventually fell to Michigan State in the second round.

After graduation, Sorrentine earned NBA Summer League spots with the Miami Heat and the Milwaukee Bucks, before signing with Banca Nuova Trapani in Italy. In that same season, Sorrentine returned stateside to suit up for the Florida Flame of the NBA Development League for the remainder of the 2005–06 season. In 2006–07, Sorrentine returned to Europe, this time to Portugal, spending the season with F.C. Porto. In his final season of professional basketball, Sorrentine spent a season in Slovenia with BC Krka, before his career was halted due to injury.

On October 26, 2019, Sorrentine's number 11 jersey was retired by the University of Vermont, on the same night former teammate Taylor Coppenrath’s number 22 was also retired.

== Coaching career ==
In 2008, Sorrentine accepted a spot on Brown's staff, reuniting with Jesse Agel, his former assistant coach at Vermont. In 2011, Sorrentine was promoted to associate head coach, and a year later was named the interim head coach of the Bears after Agel was fired and a search for a new coach was conducted. He remained on staff for the Bears under head coach Mike Martin.

On July 10, 2024, Sorrentine became an assistant coach for the Washington Wizards.
