= Vermont Catamounts men's basketball =

NCAA Division 1 program

2026–27 Vermont Catamounts men's basketball team
- University: University of Vermont
- Head coach: John Becker (16th season)
- Location: Burlington, Vermont
- Arena: Patrick Gym (capacity: 3,228)
- Conference: America East
- Nickname: Catamounts
- Colors: Green and gold
- All-time record: 1,390–1,142 (.549)

NCAA Division I tournament round of 32
- 2005

NCAA Division I tournament appearances
- 2003, 2004, 2005, 2010, 2012, 2017, 2019, 2022, 2023, 2024

Conference tournament champions
- 2003, 2004, 2005, 2010, 2012, 2017, 2019, 2020, 2022, 2023, 2024

Conference regular-season champions
- 1947, 2002, 2005, 2007, 2009, 2011, 2014, 2017, 2018, 2019, 2020, 2021, 2022, 2023, 2024

Uniforms
Home	Away	Alternate

The Vermont Catamounts men's basketball team is the men's basketball team that represents the University of Vermont in Burlington, Vermont. The school's team currently competes in the America East Conference and plays its home games at Patrick Gym. The team has reached the NCAA Division I men's basketball tournament ten times, most recently in 2024. 13-seed UVM famously upset 4-seed Syracuse University in the first round of the 2005 tournament. The Catamounts are coached by John Becker.

== History ==
=== Retired numbers ===
Five Catamount players have had their numbers retired by the University of Vermont:

Vermont Catamounts retired numbers
No.	Player	Pos.	Tenure	No. ret.	Ref.
10	Eddie Benton	PG	1992–1996	2000	
11	T. J. Sorrentine	PG	2000–2005	2019	
22	Taylor Coppenrath	C	2001–2005	2019	
33	Kevin Roberson	C	1988–1992	1992	
45	Trevor Gaines (Note: Posthumously retired. He died on July 21, 2010 at the age of 29 after he collapsed playing pick-up basketball.)		1998–2002	2011	

=== Awards ===
America East Coach of the Year

- Tom Brennan – 1991, 1998, 2002
- Mike Lonergan – 2007, 2011
- John Becker – 2014, 2017, 2018, 2019, 2020, 2022, 2024

America East Player of the Year

- Matt Johnson – 1991
- Kevin Roberson – 1992
- T.J. Sorrentine – 2002
- Taylor Coppenrath – 2003, 2004, 2005
- Marqus Blakely – 2008, 2009
- Trae Bell-Haynes – 2017, 2018
- Anthony Lamb – 2019, 2020
- Ryan Davis – 2021, 2022
- Finn Sullivan - 2023

America East Defensive Player of the Year

- Marqus Blakely – 2008, 2009, 2010
- Brendan Bald – 2011
- Brian Voelkel – 2014
- Dre Wills – 2017
- Ben Shungu – 2020

America East Rookie of the Year

- Eddie Benton – 1993
- Tony Orciari – 1998
- T.J. Sorrentine – 2001
- Taylor Coppenrath – 2002
- Mike Trimboli – 2006
- Brian Voelkel – 2011
- Four McGlynn – 2012
- Anthony Lamb – 2017

America East Newcomer of the Year

- Shamir Bogues – 2024

America East Sixth Man of the Year

- Cam Ward – 2015, 2018
- Darren Payen – 2017
- Ryan Davis – 2020
- Aaron Deloney – 2022, 2023

All-Conference First Team

- Ed Kotlarczyk – 1949
- Keith Galli – 1950
- Clyde Lord – 1957, 1958, 1959
- Benny Becton – 1961
- Ralph D'Altilia – 1965
- Frank Martiniuk – 1970
- Ron Gottschalk – 1975
- Mike Evelti – 1981, 1982
- Kevin Roberson – 1991, 1992
- Matt Johnson – 1991
- Eddie Benton – 1993, 1994, 1995, 1996
- Erik Nelson – 1998
- Tony Oriciari – 2000, 2001
- Trevor Gaines – 2002
- T.J. Sorrentine – 2002, 2004, 2005
- Taylor Coppenrath – 2003, 2004, 2005
- Chris Holm – 2007
- Mike Trimboli – 2007, 2009
- Marqus Blakely – 2008, 2009, 2010
- Evan Fjeld – 2011
- Matt Glass – 2012
- Brian Voelkel – 2013, 2014
- Sandro Carissimo – 2014
- Clancy Rugg – 2014
- Ethan O'Day – 2015
- Trae Bell-Haynes – 2017, 2018
- Anthony Lamb – 2019, 2020
- Ernie Duncan – 2019
- Stef Smith – 2020
- Ryan Davis – 2021, 2022
- Ben Shungu – 2022
- Finn Sullivan – 2023
- Robin Duncan – 2023
- Shamir Bogues – 2024

All-Conference Second Team

- Ken Pierce – 1949
- Keith Galli – 1950
- Nat Campana – 1953, 1954
- Earl Steinman – 1955
- Bob Kuchar – 1958, 1959
- Charlie Isles – 1960
- Richie Ader – 1962
- Layne Higgs – 1966
- Dave Lapointe – 1968
- Frank Martiniuk – 1969
- Joe Calavita – 1987
- Kevin Roberson – 1990
- Tony Oriciari – 1998
- Taylor Coppenrath – 2002
- Mike Trimboli – 2006, 2008
- Clancy Rugg – 2013
- Dre Wills – 2015
- Anthony Lamb – 2017
- Ernie Duncan – 2018
- Drew Uruqhart – 2018
- Stef Smith – 2021
- Ben Shungu – 2021
- Dylan Penn – 2023
- Aaron Deloney – 2024

All-Conference Third Team

- Erik Nelson – 1997
- Tony Oriciari – 1999
- Tobe Carberry – 2000
- Grant Anderson – 2003
- Martin Klimes – 2006, 2007
- Colin McIntosh – 2009
- Maurice Joseph – 2010
- Evan Fjeld – 2010
- Brendan Bald – 2011
- Brian Voelkel – 2012
- Sandro Carissimo – 2013
- Ethan O'Day – 2016
- Kurt Steidl – 2016
- Trae Bell-Haynes – 2016
- Ernie Duncan – 2017
- Payton Henson – 2017, 2018
- Isaiah Powell – 2022
- T.J Long – 2024

All-Conference Defensive Team

- Marqus Blakely – 2008, 2009, 2010
- Garvey Young – 2010
- Brendan Bald – 2011
- Brian Voelkel – 2012, 2013, 2014
- Ethan O'Day – 2014, 2015
- Dre Wills – 2015, 2016, 2017
- Ernie Duncan – 2018
- Anthony Lamb – 2019
- Samuel Dingba – 2019
- Ben Shungu – 2020, 2021, 2022
- Robin Duncan – 2023
- Shamir Bogues – 2024
- Ileri Ayo-Faleye – 2024

All-Conference Rookie Team

- Rahim Huland El – 1988
- Kenny White – 1989
- Brian Tarrant – 1990
- Eddie Benton – 1993
- Erik Nelson – 1995
- David Roach – 1997
- Tony Orciari – 1998
- Trevor Gaines – 1999
- T.J. Sorrentine – 2000
- Taylor Coppenrath – 2001
- Josh Duell – 2005
- Mike Trimboli – 2006
- Joe Trapani – 2007
- Garvey Young – 2009
- Brian Voelkel – 2011
- Four McGlynn – 2012
- Kurt Steidel – 2014
- Trae Bell-Haynes – 2015
- Ernie Duncan – 2016
- Anthony Lamb – 2017
- Stef Smith – 2018
- Robin Duncan – 2019
- T.J Hurley – 2023

All-American

- Anthony Lamb – (2019 Honorable Mention – AP)
- Trae Bell-Haynes – (2017, 2018 Honorable Mention – AP)
- Marqus Blakely – (2008, 2009 Honorable Mention – AP)
- Taylor Coppenrath – (2003, 2004, 2005 Honorable Mention – AP)
- T.J. Sorrentine – (2002 Honorable Mention – AP)
- Mike Evelti – (1981 Honorable Mention – AP)
- Ron Gottschalk - (1975 Honorable Mention - AP)

=== Hall of Fame ===
Class	Name	Year Inducted
1909	Ray Collins	1969
1922	Fredrick Harris	1972
1925	Claire G. Cayward	1969
1928	Howard A. Prentice	1971
1928	Kiki Price	1974
1929	Seeley Estabrook	1979
1931	Walter Sargent	1978
1932	Edward Winant	1971
1933	Chester Taft	1977
1934	John Beckley	1971
1935	Enos Ramon	1974
1935	Whitey Palmer	1975
1935	Edward Saba	1976
1937	Austin Ross	1973
1938	Tommy Tomasetti	1980
1939	Elmer Nelson	1975
1941	Frank Taylor	1969
1941	Donald Maley	1977
1941	Richard Healy	1993
1941	Henri Beauchemin	2007
1947	Larry Killick	1969
1948	John Durkin	1991
1950	Arthur Collier	1977
1950	Edward Kotlarczyk	1979
1951	Ralph Kehoe	1973
1953	Gary Clairmont	1987
1954	Nat Campana	1975
1955	Keith Jampolis	1983
1955	Earl Steinman	2004
1956	Roland Massimino	1983
1957	Alan McLam	1981
1959	Clyde Lord	1974
1959	Bob Kuchar	1985
1960	Charlie Isles	1976
1961	Joseph Barry	1982
1963	Benny Becton	1980
1963	Jack Shabel	1990
1963	Richard Ader	2017
1965	Charles Foster	1984
1965	Ralph D'Altilia	1988
1966	Layne Higgs	1982
1966	Milt Goggans	2018
1969	David Lapointe	1981
1970	Frank Martiniuk	1980
1970	Sandy Magid	1996
1977	Warren Prehmus	1987
1982	Michael Evelti	1992
1982	Jeff Brown	1993
1989	Joe Calavita	2000
1991	Matt Johnson	2001
1992	Kevin Roberson	1993
1992	Kenny White	2002
1996	Eddie Benton	2006
1996	Erik Nelson	2009
2001	Tony Orciari	2011
2002	Trevor Gaines	2012
2005	T.J. Sorrentine	2015
2005	Taylor Coppenrath	2015
2009	Mike Trimboli	2020
2010	Marqus Blakely	2020

== Postseason ==
=== NCAA tournament results ===
The Catamounts have appeared in the NCAA Division I tournament ten times. Their combined record is 2–10.

Year	Seed	Round	Opponent	Result
2003	#16	First Round	#1 Arizona	L 51–80
2004	#15	First Round	#2 Connecticut	L 53–70
2005	#13	First Round; Second Round	#4 Syracuse #5 Michigan State	W 60–57 OT; L 61–72
2010	#16	First Round	#1 Syracuse	L 56–79
2012	#16	First Four; First Round	#16 Lamar #1 North Carolina	W 71–59; L 58–77
2017	#13	First Round	#4 Purdue	L 70–80
2019	#13	First Round	#4 Florida State	L 69–76
2022	#13	First Round	#4 Arkansas	L 71–75
2023	#15	First Round	#2 Marquette	L 61–78
2024	#13	First Round	#4 Duke	L 47–64

=== NIT results ===
The Catamounts have appeared in the National Invitation Tournament (NIT) four times. Their combined record is 0–4.

Year	Round	Opponent	Result
2007	First Round	Kansas State	L 57–59
2011	First Round	Cleveland State	L 60–63
2014	First Round	Georgia	L 56–63
2018	First Round	Middle Tennessee	L 64–91

=== CBI results ===
The Catamounts have appeared in the College Basketball Invitational (CBI) four times. Their combined record is 5–4.

Year	Round	Opponent	Result
2009	First Round; Quarterfinals	Green Bay; Oregon State	W 76–72; L 70–71 OT
2013	First Round	Santa Clara	L 67–77
2015	First Round; Quarterfinals; Semifinals	Hofstra; Radford; Louisiana–Monroe	W 85–81; W 78–71; L 65–71
2016	First Round; Quarterfinals; Semifinals	Western Carolina; Seattle; Nevada	W 79–74; W 73–54; L 72–86

== Coaches ==
Years	Coach	Record	Pct.	Conference Titles	NCAA Tournament Appearances
1906–1908	Thomas Hayes	12–9	.571	-	-
1920–1921	P.A. Larned	10–5	.667	-	-
1921–25	Thomas Keady	56–15	.789	-	-
1925–1928	W.J. McAvoy	33–23	.589	-	-
1928–1929	Claire G. Cayward	7–10	.412	-	-
1929–1930	K.L. Berry	4–16	.200	-	-
1930–1931	Howard A. Prentice	4–13	.235	-	-
1931–1934	John H. Burke	16–27	.372	-	-
1934–1940	John P. Sabo	50–34	.595	-	-
1940–1943; 1945–1965	John C. Evans	260–196	.571	1 (Yankee Conference)	-
1965–1972	Arthur Loche	69–96	.418	-	-
1972–1981	Peter Salzberg	105–128	.441	-	-
1981–1986	Bill Whitmore	45–94	.324	-	-
1986–2005	Tom Brennan	264–276	.489	3 (America East)	3 (2003, 2004, 2005)
2005–2011	Mike Lonergan	126–68	.649	1 (America East)	1 (2010)
2011–present	John Becker	329–132	.714	7 (America East)	7 (2012, 2017, 2019, 2020, 2022, 2023, 2024)

== Season-by-season results ==
Vermont Catamounts Basketball Season Log

1900s
Season	Head Coach	Conf.	Overall	Conference tournament	Postseason
1900–01	No Coach		1–10		
1901–02	No Coach		1–4		
1902–03	No Coach		2–5		
1903–04	No Coach		5–6		
1904–05	No Coach		3–6		
1905–06	No Coach		1–1		
1906–07	Thomas E. Hayes		7–4		
1907–08	Thomas E. Hayes		7–4		

1920s
Season	Head Coach	Conf.	Overall	Conference tournament	Postseason
1920–21	P.A. Larned		10–5		
1921–22	Thomas Keady		15–4		
1922–23	Thomas Keady		12–6		
1923–24	Thomas Keady		15–2		
1924–25	Thomas Keady		14–3		
1925–26	W. J. McAvoy		12–9		
1926–27	W. J. McAvoy		11–5		
1927–28	W. J. McAvoy		10–9		
1928–29	Claire G. Cayward		7–10		
1929–30	K. L. Berry		4–16		

1930s
Season	Head Coach	Conf.	Overall	Conference tournament	Postseason
1930–31	Howard A. Prentice		4–13		
1931–32	J.H. Burke		6–9		
1932–33	J.H. Burke		6–8		
1933–34	J.H. Burke		4–10		
1934–35	John Sabo		8–5		
1935–36	John Sabo		7–6		
1936–37	John Sabo		10–4		
1937–38	John Sabo		10–4		
1938–39	John Sabo		10–5		
1939–40	John Sabo		5–10		

1940s
Season	Head Coach	Conf.	Overall	Conference tournament	Postseason
1940–41	John Evans		9–5		
1941–42	John Evans		10–5		
1942–43	John Evans		10–6		
1945–46	John Evans		10–4		
1946–47	John Evans		19–3		
1947–48	John Evans		14–6		
Yankee Conference (1948–1976)
1948–49	John Evans	2–1	15–5		
1949–50	John Evans	2–3	9–11		

1950s
Season	Head Coach	Conf.	Overall	Conference tournament	Postseason
1950–51	John Evans	4–1	14–6		
1951–52	John Evans	3–1	14–6		
1952–53	John Evans	1–2	11–10		
1953–54	John Evans	1–2	13–7		
1954–55	John Evans	4–1	6–15		
1955–56	John Evans	2–3	6–12		
1956–57	John Evans	3–2	15–5		
1957–58	John Evans	5–5	15–10		
1958–59	John Evans	4–6	12–10		
1959–60	John Evans	2–8	9–11		

1960s
Season	Head Coach	Conf.	Overall	Conference tournament	Postseason
1960–61	John Evans	3–7	9–11		
1961–62	John Evans	3–7	12–12		
1962–63	John Evans	2–8	10–13		
1963–64	John Evans	4–6	11–10		
1964–65	John Evans	1–9	7–13		
1965–66	Arthur Loche	3–7	12–8		
1966–67	Arthur Loche	1–9	9–15		
1967–68	Arthur Loche	5–5	12–12		
1968–69	Arthur Loche	3–7	14–11		
1969–70	Arthur Loche	3–7	8–16		

1970s
Season	Head Coach	Conf.	Overall	Conference tournament	Postseason
1970–71	Arthur Loche	1–9	9–15		
1971–72	Arthur Loche	0–10	5–19		
1972–73	Peter Salzberg	2–12	8–16		
1973–74	Peter Salzberg	3–9	9–17		
1974–75	Peter Salzberg	8–4	16–10		
1975–76	Peter Salzberg	6–6	15–10		
1976–77	Peter Salzberg		9–16		
1977–78	Peter Salzberg		11–15		
1978–79	Peter Salzberg		9–17		
America East (1979–present)
1979–80	Peter Salzberg	4–4	12–15	America East quarterfinal (L Holy Cross 90–74)	

1980s
Season	Head Coach	Conf.	Overall	Conference tournament	Postseason
1980–81	Peter Salzberg	5–5	16–12	America East semifinal (W Boston University 85–84 3OT) (L Northeastern 76–69 OT)	
1981–82	Bill Whitmore	2–8	10–16		
1982–83	Bill Whitmore	4–8	10–19	America East quarterfinal (W Colgate 62–61) (L Boston University 80–75)	
1983–84	Bill Whitmore	3–11	7–21	America East quarterfinal (L Canisius 90–76)	
1984–85	Bill Whitmore	5–12	9–19	America East quarterfinal (L Siena 65–56)	
1985–86	Bill Whitmore	5–13	9–19	America East quarterfinal (L Northeastern 81–62)	
1986–87	Tom Brennan	3–15	5–23	America East quarterfinal (L Niagara 109–90)	
1987–88	Tom Brennan	2–16	3–24		
1988–89	Tom Brennan	4–14	6–21		
1989–90	Tom Brennan	4–8	13–17	America East Final (W Maine 78–75) (W Northeastern 76–62) (L Boston University 75–57)	

1990s
Season	Head Coach	Conf.	Overall	Conference tournament	Postseason
1990–91	Tom Brennan	5–5	15–13	America East quarterfinal (L Hartford 85–65)	
1991–92	Tom Brennan	7–7	16–13	America East semifinal (W Northeastern 74–64) (L Delaware 76–64)	
1992–93	Tom Brennan	4–10	10–17	America East quarterfinal (L Northeastern 91–68)	
1993–94	Tom Brennan	3–11	12–15	America East quarterfinal (L Maine 77–55)	
1994–95	Tom Brennan	7–9	14–13	America East quarterfinal (L Northeastern 73–71 OT)	
1995–96	Tom Brennan	10–8	12–15	America East quarterfinal (L Maine 84–75)	
1996–97	Tom Brennan	7–11	11–16	America East quarterfinal (L Hartford 70–44)	
1997–98	Tom Brennan	11–7	16–11	America East quarterfinal (L Drexel 51–42)	
1998–99	Tom Brennan	7–11	11–16	America East quarterfinal (L Hofstra 69–59)	
1999–2000	Tom Brennan	11–7	16–12	America East quarterfinal (L Drexel 71–59)	

2000s
Season	Head Coach	Conf.	Overall	Conference tournament	Postseason
2000–01	Tom Brennan	7–11	12–17	America East quarterfinal (W New Hampshire 78–73) (L Hofstra 68–55)	
2001–02	Tom Brennan	13–3	21–8	America East semifinal (W Stony Brook 74–59) (L Maine 61–59 OT)	
2002–03	Tom Brennan	11–5	21–12	America East tournament champions (W Albany 81–62) (W Hartford 67–51) (W Boston University 56–55)	NCAA first round (L Arizona 80–51)
2003–04	Tom Brennan	15–3	22–9	America East tournament champions (W New Hampshire 58–50) (W Hartford 61–48) (W Maine 72–53)	NCAA first round (L Connecticut 70–53)
2004–05	Tom Brennan	16–2	25–7	America East tournament champions (W UMBC 76–61) (W Northeastern 80–57)	NCAA second round (W Syracuse 60–57 OT) (L Michigan State 72–61)
2005–06	Mike Lonergan	7–9	13–17	America East Final (W Boston University 64–61) (W Binghamton 66–59) (L Albany 80–67)	
2006–07	Mike Lonergan	15–1	25–8	America East Final (W Hartford 90–73) (W UMBC 72–63) (L Albany 60–59)	NIT first round (L Kansas State 59–57)
2007–08	Mike Lonergan	9–7	16–15	America East semifinal (W Binghamton 65–57) (L UMBC 73–64)	
2008–09	Mike Lonergan	13–3	24–9	America East quarterfinal (L Albany 56–52 OT)	CBI Quarterfinals (W UW-Green Bay 76–72) (L Oregon State 71–70 OT)
2009–10	Mike Lonergan	12–4	25–10	America East tournament champions (W UMBC 76–59) (W New Hampshire 57–38) (W Boston University 83–70)	NCAA first round (L Syracuse 79–56)

2010s
Season	Head Coach	Conf.	Overall	Conference tournament	Postseason
2010–11	Mike Lonergan	13–3	23–9	America East semifinal (W Binghamton 57–46) (L Stony Brook 69–47)	NIT first round (L Cleveland State 63–60)
2011–12	John Becker	13–3	24–12	America East tournament champions (W Maine 50–40) (W Hartford 77–73 2OT) (W Stony Brook 51–43)	NCAA second round (W Lamar 71–59) (L North Carolina 77–58)
2012–13	John Becker	11–5	21–12	America East tournament Final (W UNH 61–42) (W UMBC 85–72) (L Albany 53–49)	2013 CBI first round (L Santa Clara 77–67)
2013–14	John Becker	15–1	22–10	America East Semi-finals (W UNH 77–60) (L Albany 58–67)	2014 NIT first round (L Georgia 56–63)
2014–15	John Becker	12–4	20–14	America East Semi-finals (W UMBC 66–39) (L Stony Brook 77–79)	2015 CBI Semi-finals (W Hofstra 85–81) (W Radford 78–71) (L Louisiana-Monroe 65–71)
2015–16	John Becker	11–5	23–14	America East tournament Final (W Maine 99–82) (W New Hampshire 63–56) (L Stony Brook 74–80)	2016 CBI Semi-finals (W Western Carolina 79–74) (W Seattle 73–54) (L Nevada 72–86)
2016–17	John Becker	16–0	29–6	America East tournament champions (W Maine 86–41) (W New Hampshire 74–41) (W Albany 56–53)	NCAA first round (L Purdue 70–80)
2017–18	John Becker	15–1	27–8	America East tournament Final (W Maine 75–60) (W Stony Brook 70–51) (L UMBC 62–65)	NIT first round (L Middle Tennessee 64–91)
2018–19	John Becker	14–2	27–7	America East tournament champions (W Maine 73–57) (W Binghamton 84–51) (W UMBC 66–49)	NCAA first round (L Florida State 69–76)
2019–20	John Becker	14–2	27–6	America East tournament champions (W Maine 61–50) (W UMBC 81–74) (vs. Hartford canceled due to COVID-19 pandemic)	

2020s
Season	Head Coach	Conf.	Overall	Conference tournament	Postseason
2020–21	John Becker	10–4	10–5	America East tournament Semi-finals (L Hartford 65–71)	
2021–22	John Becker	17–1	28–6	America East tournament champions (W NJIT 98–59) (W Binghamton 74–42) (W UMBC 82–43)	NCAA first round (L Arkansas 71–75)
2022–23	John Becker	14–2	23–11	America East tournament champions (W NJIT 84–57) (W Binghamton 79–57) (W UMass Lowell 72–59)	NCAA first round (L Marquette 61–78)
2023–24	John Becker	15–1	28–7	America East tournament champions (W Albany 75–72) (W UNH 66–59) (W UMass Lowell 66–61)	NCAA first round (L Duke 47–64)
2024–25	John Becker	13–3	21–12	America East Semi-finals (W New Hampshire 64–57) (L Maine 42–57)	

All-Time Conference Record: 515–440 (.539)
All-Time Overall Record: 1405-1173 (.545)

== Records ==
=== All-time leaders ===
==== Points ====
Rank	Player	Career	Games	Average	Total
1	Eddie Benton	1992–1996	104	23.8	2,474
2	Taylor Coppenrath	2001–2005	114	21.4	2,442
3	T.J. Sorrentine	2000–2005	120	16.8	2,013
4	Mike Trimboli	2005–2009	126	15.9	2,008
5	Anthony Lamb	2016–2020	118	16.4	1,933
6	Marqus Blakely	2006–2010	129	14.5	1,875
7	Tony Orciari	1997–2001	109	16.0	1,743
8	Mike Evelti	1978–1982	107	15.9	1,697
9	Trae Bell-Haynes	2014–2018	139	11.7	1,629
10	Kevin Roberson	1988–1992	112	13.4	1,503

==== Assists ====
Rank	Player	Career	Games	Average	Total
1	Brian Voelkel	2010–2014	134	5.0	679
2	Mike Trimboli	2005–2009	126	5.0	624
3	Kenny White	1988–1992	114	4.9	565
4	T.J. Sorrentine	2000–2005	120	4.6	548
5	Trae Bell-Haynes	2014–2018	139	3.7	518
6	Howard Hudson	1982–1986	102	5.0	511
7	Eddie Benton	1992–1996	102	4.4	458
8	David Roach	1996–2000	106	4.1	435
9	Jeff Brown	1978–1982	105	4.1	428
10	Corey Wielgus	1977–1982	101	3.4	341

==== Rebounds ====
Rank	Player	Career	Games	Average	Total
1	Brian Voelkel	2010–2014	134	8.7	1,168
2	Kevin Roberson	1988–1992	112	9.4	1,054
3	Marqus Blakely	2006–2010	129	8.1	1,044
4	Benny Becton	1960–1963	66	14.9	986
5	Trevor Gaines	1998–2002	111	7.9	880
6	Taylor Coppenrath	2001–2005	114	7.4	839
7	Erik Nelson	1994–1998	103	7.7	795
8	Anthony Lamb	2016–2020	118	6.5	765
9	Milt Goggins	1963–1966	61	12.1	740
10	Mike Evelti	1978–1982	107	6.9	735

=== Results against nationally ranked opponents ===
Vermont has played a ranked opponent 36 times, going 2–34.

Date	Opponent	
December 7, 1973	at No. 6 North Carolina State	L 42–97
December 8, 1973	at No. 13 North Carolina	L 48–103
October 29, 1973	at No. 10 Vanderbilt	L 56–91
December 21, 1976	at No. 2 Notre Dame	L 48–89
December 30, 1978	vs. No. 12 Texas A&M	L 76–104
December 28, 1979	at No. 1 Duke	L 67–92
December 3, 1988	at No. 18 Villanova	L 58–80
November 19, 1999	at No. 8 Connecticut	L 52–89
November 29, 1999	at No. 15 Ohio State	L 51–74
December 21, 2000	at No. 21 Notre Dame	L 86–96
December 19, 2002	at No. 23 North Carolina	L 54–80
March 20, 2003	vs. No. 1 Arizona %	L 51–80
March 18, 2004	vs. No. 9 Connecticut %	L 53–70
November 19, 2004	at No. 1 Kansas	L 61–68
March 18, 2005	vs. No. 11 Syracuse %	W 60–57^{OT}
March 20, 2005	vs. No. 13 Michigan State %	L 61–72
November 23, 2005	vs. No. 22 Nevada	L 62–77
November 13, 2006	at No. 14 Boston College	W 77–63
December 6, 2008	at No. 3 Pittsburgh	L 51–80
March 19, 2010	vs. No. 3 Syracuse %	L 56–79
December 8, 2010	vs. No. 18 Brigham Young $	L 58–86
December 7, 2011	at No. 22 Saint Louis	L 43–62
March 16, 2012	vs. No. 4 North Carolina %	L 58–77
November 13, 2012	at No. 23 Connecticut	L 49–67
November 24, 2013	at No. 6 Duke	L 90–91
November 15, 2015	at No. 23 Purdue	L 79–107
December 1, 2016	at No. 20 South Carolina	L 50–68
December 21, 2016	at No. 13 Butler	L 69–81
March 16, 2017	vs. No. 15 Purdue %	L 70–80
November 12, 2017	at No. 5 Kentucky	L 69–72
November 12, 2018	at No. 2 Kansas	L 68–84
March 21, 2019	vs. No. 10 Florida State %	L 69–76
November 19, 2019	at No. 7 Virginia	L 55–61
November 13, 2021	at No. 21 Maryland	L 57–68
March 17, 2022	vs. No. 17 Arkansas %	L 75–71
March 17, 2023	vs. No. 6 Marquette %	L 78–61

% NCAA Tournament game
$ in Glens Falls, New York

== Media ==
The Catamounts receive regular television, newspaper and radio coverage throughout the year. All home conference games are broadcast on ESPN3, while radio broadcasts can be heard on WCPV (101.3 ESPN). Three television stations – WCAX-TV, WFFF-TV, and WPTZ – provide local coverage, while The Burlington Free Press provides extensive reporting of Vermont basketball, as well.
