= Maine Black Bears men's basketball =

Basketball team (University of Maine)

2026–27 Maine Black Bears men's basketball team
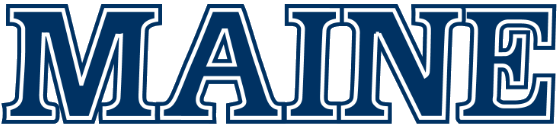
- University: University of Maine
- First season: 1904–05
- Head coach: Chris Markwood (5th season)
- Location: Orono, Maine
- Arena: Cross Insurance Center, Memorial Gym (capacity: 5,800, 3,100)
- Conference: America East
- Nickname: Black Bears
- Colors: Maine blue, white, and navy
- All-time record: 1184–903

Uniforms
Home	Away

The Maine Black Bears men's basketball team is the basketball team that represents University of Maine in Orono, Maine, United States. The school's team currently competes in the America East Conference, which they joined upon its founding in 1979. Their current head coach is Chris Markwood, who took over in March 2022.

The Black Bears are one of 37 eligible Division I programs to have never appeared in the NCAA Division I men's basketball tournament; their 78 seasons without a postseason bid is sixth most all-time among the teams in the drought. They have never been invited to a postseason tournament of any kind while having made the America East men's basketball tournament final four times; they competed for the championship in 2025.

== Coaches ==
		Overall		Conference		
Coach	Years	Record	Pct.	Record	Pct.	Notes
George Huntington	1903–05	15–11	.577			
George Owen	1905–06	10–4	.714			
John Phelan	1906–08	12–9	.571			
John Neary	1908–10	13–7	.650			
William C. Kenyon	1937–42; 1944–45	30–45	.413	9–31	.225	
Samuel Sezak	1942–44	8–14	.364	4–4	.500	
Eck Allen	1945–49	34–33	.507	8–20	.286	
Rome Rankin	1949–54	38–53	.418	11–27	.289	
Russell DeVette	1954–55	4–13	.235	1–7	.125	
Harold Woodbury	1955–58	20–38	.345	9–17	.346	
Brian McCall	1958–68	38–53	.418	11–27	.289	
Gil Philbrick	1968–71	25–21	.543	9–21	.300	
Skip Chappelle	1971–88	217–226	.490	89–124	.418	
Rudy Keeling	1988–96	106–122	.465	60–56	.517	
John Giannini	1997–04	125–111	.530	75–65	.536	
Ted Woodward	2004–14	117–178	.397	65–97	.401	
Bob Walsh	2014–18	24–100	.194	12–52	.188	
Richard Barron	2018–22	21–76	.216	12–42	.222	
Jai Steadman	2022	1–3	.250	1–3	.250	
Chris Markwood	2022–present	48-48	.500	24-24	.500	

== Rivalries ==
- University of New Hampshire Wildcats – Maine's rivalry with UNH is the longest continuous rivalry between two non-Ivy League schools, lasting 116 seasons as of 2020.

== Team records ==
=== Single Season records ===
	Player	Record	Season
MIN	Errick Greene	1135	2001–02
PT	Rufus Harris	718	1979–80
PPG	Rufus Harris	25.6	1979–80
FG	Rufus Harris	271	1979–80
FG%	John Rupert	.660	2010–11
3PT	John Rupert	107	2010–11
3PT%	John Rupert	.447	2010–11
FT	Rufus Harris	176	1979–80
FT%	John Rupert	.902	2010–11
REB	Robert Warner	352	1974–75
AST	Andy Bedard	193	1999–00
STL	Marty Higgins	95	1991–92
BLK	Justin Rowe	121	2001–02

=== Career records ===
	Player	Record	Season
MIN	Gerald McLemore	3856	2008–12
PT	Rufus Harris	2206	1976–80
PPG	Jim Stephenon	22.7	1966–69
FG	Rufus Harris	834	1976–80
FG%	Kevin Nelson	.545	1975–79
3PT	Gerald McLemore	323	2008–12
3PT%	Gerald McLemore	.382	2008–12
FT	Rufus Harris	538	1976–80
FT%	Rufus Harris	.791	1976–80
REB	Allen Ledbetter	1017	1995–99
AST	Marty Higgins	619	1988–92
STL	Marty Higgins	243	1988–92
BLK	Justin Rowe	226	2001–03

== Notable players ==
Maine has had two players go on to play in the National Basketball Association: Rick Carlisle (who transferred to Virginia before being drafted) and Jeff Cross.

Other notable players include:

- John Rupert, Accomplished 17 shooting records in a single season
- Rufus Harris, 1979–80 America East Conference Player of the Year
- Noam Laish (born 1993), Israeli basketball player
