= 2001–02 Vermont Catamounts men's basketball team =

American college basketball season

2001–02 Vermont Catamounts men's basketball

America East regular season co-champions
- Conference: America East Conference
- Record: 21–8 (13–3 America East)
- Head coach: Tom Brennan (16th season)
- Associate head coach: Jesse Agel (14th season)
- Assistant coaches: Pat Filien (1st season); Jeff Rush (1st season)
- Home arena: Patrick Gym

2001–02 America East Conference men's basketball standings
| | Conf. | | | | Overall |
| Team | W | | L | PCT | W | | L | PCT |
|---|---|---|---|---|---|---|---|---|
| Vermont | 13 | – | 3 | .813 | 21 | – | 8 | .724 |
| Boston University † | 13 | – | 3 | .813 | 22 | – | 10 | .688 |
| Hartford | 10 | – | 6 | .625 | 14 | – | 18 | .438 |
| New Hampshire | 8 | – | 8 | .500 | 11 | – | 17 | .393 |
| Maine | 7 | – | 9 | .438 | 12 | – | 18 | .400 |
| Binghamton | 6 | – | 10 | .375 | 9 | – | 19 | .321 |
| Albany | 5 | – | 11 | .313 | 8 | – | 20 | .286 |
| Northeastern | 5 | – | 11 | .313 | 7 | – | 21 | .250 |
| Stony Brook | 5 | – | 11 | .313 | 6 | – | 22 | .214 |
† 2002 America East tournament winner

The 2001–02 Vermont Catamounts men's basketball team represented University of Vermont during the 2001–02 NCAA Division I men's basketball season. The Catamounts, led by head coach Tom Brennan – coaching in his 16th season, played their home games at Patrick Gym and were members of the America East Conference. They finished the season 21–8, 13–3 in America East play to finish tied atop in the regular season conference standings. The Catamounts would lose in the semifinals of the America East tournament to Maine.

== Roster ==
2001–02 Vermont Catamounts men's basketball team
Players
Coaches

| Pos. | # | Name | Height | Weight | Year | Hometown |
|---|---|---|---|---|---|---|---|
| G | 11 | T. J. Sorrentine | 5 ft 11 in (1.8 m) | 185 lb (84 kg) | So | St. Raphael Academy | Pawtucket, Rhode Island |
| F | 22 | Taylor Coppenrath | 6 ft 9 in (2.06 m) | 240 lb (109 kg) | So | St. Johnsbury Academy | Barnet, Vermont |

Head coach

- Tom Brennan (Georgia)

Assistant coach(es)

- Jesse Agel (Vermont)

Legend

- (C) Team captain
- (S) Suspended
- (I) Ineligible
- (W) Walk-on
- Injured
- Current redshirt

Roster
Last update: March 26, 2026

== Schedule and results ==
| Date time, TV | Rank^{#} | Opponent^{#} | Result | Record | Site (attendance) city, state |
Regular season
| Nov 16, 2001* | | vs. Brown; Mohegan Sun Classic | L 58–82 | 0–1 | William H. Detrick Gymnasium (450); New Britain, Connecticut |
| Nov 17, 2001* | | vs. Bucknell; Mohegan Sun Classic | W 77–60 | 1–1 | William H. Detrick Gymnasium (480); New Britain, Connecticut |
| Nov 20, 2001* | | at Dartmouth | W 73–54 | 2–1 | Leede Arena (1,020); Hanover, New Hampshire |
| Nov 24, 2001* | | Cleveland State | L 69–72 | 2–2 | Patrick Gym (1,551); Burlington, Vermont |
| Nov 26, 2001* | | at Duquesne | L 77–82 ^{OT} | 2–3 | A.J. Palumbo Center (2,947); Pittsburgh, Pennsylvania |
| Dec 2, 2001* | | Lehigh | W 83–75 | 3–3 | Patrick Gym (1,445); Burlington, Vermont |
| Dec 5, 2001* | | at Sacred Heart | W 85–62 | 4–3 | William H. Pitt Center (573); Fairfield, Connecticut |
| Dec 18, 2001* | | Harvard | W 74–54 | 5–3 | Patrick Gym (1,115); Burlington, Vermont |
| Dec 27, 2001* | | at FIU; FIU Holiday Classic | W 69–64 | 6–3 | Golden Panther Arena (559); Miami, Florida |
| Dec 28, 2001* | | vs. Ohio; FIU Holiday Classic | W 91–79 | 7–3 | US Century Bank Arena (328); Miami, Florida |
| Dec 31, 2001 | | Albany | W 71–43 | 8–3 (1–0) | Patrick Gym (2,045); Burlington, Vermont |
| Jan 2, 2002 | | Stony Brook | W 91–60 | 9–3 (2–0) | Patrick Gym (1,424); Burlington, Vermont |
| Jan 5, 2002 | | at Boston University | W 74–65 | 10–3 (3–0) | Case Gym (898); Boston, Massachusetts |
| Jan 7, 2002 | | at Northeastern | W 80–77 | 11–3 (4–0) | Cabot Center (714); Boston, Massachusetts |
| Jan 11, 2002 | | Maine | W 79–65 | 12–3 (5–0) | Patrick Gym (2,811); Burlington, Vermont |
| Jan 14, 2002 | | New Hampshire | W 81–68 | 13–3 (6–0) | Patrick Gym (3,004); Burlington, Vermont |
| Jan 17, 2002 | | Northeastern | W 101–87 | 14–3 (7–0) | Patrick Gym (3,228); Burlington, Vermont |
| Jan 20, 2002 | | at Hartford | L 65–78 | 14–4 (7–1) | Chase Family Arena (1,309); Hartford, Connecticut |
| Jan 24, 2002 | | at Stony Brook | W 72–67 | 15–4 (8–1) | Stony Brook University Arena (1,084); Stony Brook, New York |
| Jan 26, 2002* | | at Michigan | L 62–75 | 15–5 | Crisler Arena (11,243); Ann Arbor, Michigan |
| Feb 2, 2002 | | at Boston University | W 89–85 ^{OT} | 16–5 (9–1) | Patrick Gym (3,228); Burlington, Vermont |
| Feb 8, 2002 | | at Binghamton | W 83–80 | 17–5 (10–1) | West Gym (2,217); Vestal, New York |
| Feb 10, 2002 | | at Albany | L 45–61 | 17–6 (10–2) | Recreation and Convocation Center (2,712); Albany, New York |
| Feb 13, 2002 | | Binghamton | W 86–71 | 18–6 (11–2) | Patrick Gym (2,811); Burlington, Vermont |
| Feb 17, 2002 | | at Maine | L 49–52 | 18–7 (11–3) | Alfond Arena (1,639); Orono, Maine |
| Feb 22, 2002 | | at New Hampshire | W 93–77 | 19–7 (12–3) | Lundholm Gym (1,041); Durham, New Hampshire |
| Feb 24, 2002 | | Hartford | W 75–66 | 20–7 (13–3) | Patrick Gym (3,228); Burlington, Vermont |
America East tournament
| Mar 2, 2002* | (1) | vs. (8) Stony Brook; Quarterfinals | W 74–59 | 21–7 | Matthews Arena (2,310); Boston, Massachusetts |
| Mar 3, 2002* | (1) | vs. (5) Maine; Semifinals | L 59–61 ^{OT} | 21–8 | Matthews Arena (2,402); Boston, Massachusetts |
*Non-conference game. ^{#}Rankings from AP poll. (#) Tournament seedings in parentheses. All times are in Eastern Time.

== Awards and honors ==
- T. J. Sorrentine – America East Player of the Year
- Taylor Coppenrath – America East Rookie of the Year
