= 2001–02 Boston University Terriers men's basketball team =

American college basketball season

2001–02 Boston University Terriers men's basketball

America East regular season co-champions America East tournament champions

NCAA tournament, first round
- Conference: America East Conference
- Record: 22–10 (13–3 America East)
- Head coach: Dennis Wolff (8th season)
- Assistant coaches: Larry Greer (8th season); Orlando Vandross (5th season); Jason Williford (2nd season)
- Home arena: Case Gym

2001–02 America East Conference men's basketball standings
| | Conf. | | | | Overall |
| Team | W | | L | PCT | W | | L | PCT |
|---|---|---|---|---|---|---|---|---|
| Vermont | 13 | – | 3 | .813 | 21 | – | 8 | .724 |
| Boston University † | 13 | – | 3 | .813 | 22 | – | 10 | .688 |
| Hartford | 10 | – | 6 | .625 | 14 | – | 18 | .438 |
| New Hampshire | 8 | – | 8 | .500 | 11 | – | 17 | .393 |
| Maine | 7 | – | 9 | .438 | 12 | – | 18 | .400 |
| Binghamton | 6 | – | 10 | .375 | 9 | – | 19 | .321 |
| Albany | 5 | – | 11 | .313 | 8 | – | 20 | .286 |
| Northeastern | 5 | – | 11 | .313 | 7 | – | 21 | .250 |
| Stony Brook | 5 | – | 11 | .313 | 6 | – | 22 | .214 |
† 2002 America East tournament winner

The 2001–02 Boston University Terriers men's basketball team represented Boston University during the 2001–02 NCAA Division I men's basketball season. The Terriers, led by eighth year head coach Dennis Wolff, played their home games at Case Gym and were members of the America East Conference. They finished the season 22–10, 13–3 in America East play to finish tied atop in the regular season conference standings. The Terriers won the America East tournament to receive the conference's automatic bid to the NCAA tournament. Playing as No. 16 seed in the West region, Boston University was defeated by No. 1 seed Cincinnati in the opening round, 90–52.

== Roster ==
2001–02 Boston University Terriers men's basketball team
| Players | Coaches |
|---|---|
| Pos. / # / Name / Height / Weight / Year / Hometown; G / 10 / Chaz Carr / 5 ft 10 in (1.78 m) / 184 lb (83 kg) / Fr / Manchester, Connecticut | Head coach: Dennis Wolff (Connecticut); Assistant coach(es) Legend: (C) Team captain; (S) Suspended; (I) Ineligible; (W) Walk-on; Injured; Current redshirt |

== Schedule and results ==
| Date time, TV | Rank^{#} | Opponent^{#} | Result | Record | Site (attendance) city, state |
Regular season
| Nov 13, 2001* | | vs. New Orleans; Guardians Classic | W 69–63 | 1–0 | Carver-Hawkeye Arena (15,500); Iowa City, Iowa |
| Nov 14, 2001* | | at No. 9 Iowa; Guardians Classic | L 61–90 | 1–1 | Carver-Hawkeye Arena (15,500); Iowa City, Iowa |
| Nov 18, 2001* | | at No. 17 Boston College | L 65–82 | 1–2 | Silvio O. Conte Forum (5,528); Chestnut Hill, Massachusetts |
| Nov 25, 2001* | | Saint Peter's | W 70–58 | 2–2 | Case Gym; Boston, Massachusetts |
| Nov 28, 2001* | | at George Washington | L 76–79 | 2–3 | Charles E. Smith Center; Washington, D.C. |
| Dec 1, 2001* | | at Holy Cross | W 61–49 | 3–3 | Hart Center; Worcester, Massachusetts |
| Dec 4, 2001* | | Harvard | W 51–41 | 4–3 | Case Gym; Boston, Massachusetts |
| Dec 8, 2001* | | at Columbia | L 47–68 | 4–4 | Levien Gymnasium; New York, New York |
| Dec 12, 2001* | | Dartmouth | W 79–58 | 5–4 | Case Gym; Boston, Massachusetts |
| Dec 22, 2001* | | at Providence | L 62–68 | 5–5 | Dunkin Donuts Center; Providence, Rhode Island |
| Dec 28, 2001* | | at Green Bay; Oneida Bingo & Casino Classic | W 79–75 ^{OT} | 6–5 | Brown County Arena; Green Bay, Wisconsin |
| Dec 29, 2001* | | vs. UC Irvine; Oneida Bingo & Casino Classic | L 71–77 | 6–6 | Brown County Arena; Green Bay, Wisconsin |
| Jan 2, 2002 | | at New Hampshire | W 70–65 | 7–6 (1–0) | Lundholm Gym; Durham, New Hampshire |
| Jan 5, 2002 | | Vermont | L 65–74 | 7–7 (1–1) | Case Gym (898); Boston, Massachusetts |
| Jan 7, 2002 | | at Hartford | W 70–56 | 8–7 (2–1) | Chase Family Arena; Hartford, Connecticut |
| Jan 10, 2002 | | Binghamton | W 62–50 | 9–7 (3–1) | Case Gym; Boston, Massachusetts |
| Jan 12, 2002 | | Stony Brook | W 90–54 | 10–7 (4–1) | Case Gym; Boston, Massachusetts |
| Jan 20, 2002 | | at Northeastern | W 95–88 ^{OT} | 11–7 (5–1) | Cabot Center; Boston, Massachusetts |
| Jan 24, 2002 | | at Albany | W 64–49 | 12–7 (6–1) | Recreation and Convocation Center; Albany, New York |
| Jan 26, 2002 | | at Binghamton | W 55–53 | 13–7 (7–1) | West Gym; Vestal, New York |
| Jan 29, 2002 | | Hartford | L 42–44 | 13–8 (7–2) | Case Gym; Boston, Massachusetts |
| Feb 2, 2002 | | at Vermont | L 85–89 ^{OT} | 13–9 (7–3) | Patrick Gym (3,228); Burlington, Vermont |
| Feb 8, 2002 | | at Maine | W 61–59 | 14–9 (8–3) | Alfond Arena; Orono, Maine |
| Feb 10, 2002 | | New Hampshire | W 63–56 | 15–9 (9–3) | Case Gym; Boston, Massachusetts |
| Feb 12, 2002 | | Northeastern | W 63–57 | 16–9 (10–3) | Case Gym; Boston, Massachusetts |
| Feb 16, 2002 | | Albany | W 68–56 | 17–9 (11–3) | Case Gym; Boston, Massachusetts |
| Feb 21, 2002 | | at Stony Brook | W 64–62 | 18–9 (12–3) | Stony Brook University Arena; Stony Brook, New York |
| Feb 24, 2002 | | Maine | W 68–56 | 19–9 (13–3) | Case Gym; Boston, Massachusetts |
America East tournament
| Mar 2, 2002* | (2) | vs. (7) Northeastern; Quarterfinals | W 86–76 | 20–9 | Matthews Arena (2,016); Boston, Massachusetts |
| Mar 3, 2002* | (2) | vs. (3) Hartford; Semifinals | W 63–60 | 21–9 | Matthews Arena (2,402); Boston, Massachusetts |
| Mar 9, 2002* | (2) | (5) Maine; Championship game | W 66–40 | 22–9 | Case Gym (1,738); Boston, Massachusetts |
NCAA tournament
| Mar 15, 2002* | (16 W) | vs. (1 W) No. 5 Cincinnati; First round | L 52–90 | 22–10 | Mellon Arena (17,232); Pittsburgh, Pennsylvania |
*Non-conference game. ^{#}Rankings from AP poll. (#) Tournament seedings in parentheses. W=West. All times are in Eastern Time.
