= List of Albany Great Danes football seasons =

This is a list of seasons completed by the Albany Great Danes football team of the National Collegiate Athletic Association (NCAA) Division I Football Championship Subdivision (FCS).

== Seasons ==
National champions	Conference champions	Bowl game berth	Playoff berth

Season	Year	Head Coach	Association	Division	Conference	Record							Postseason	Final ranking
Season	Year	Head Coach	Association	Division	Conference	Overall			Conference				Postseason	Final ranking
Season	Year	Head Coach	Association	Division	Conference	Win	Loss	Tie	Finish	Win	Loss	Tie	Postseason	Final ranking
Albany Great Danes
1922	1922	Francis Boggs Snavely	—	—	—	0	3	2					—	—
1923	1923	Francis Boggs Snavely	—	—	—	1	5	0					—	—
1924	1924	Francis Boggs Snavely	—	—	—	0	4	1					—	—
No team from 1925 to 1969
1970	1970	Bob Ford	Club team			2	4	0					—	—
1971	1971	Bob Ford	Club team			4	4	0					—	—
1972	1972	Bob Ford	Club team			6	1	1					—	—
1973	1973	Bob Ford	NCAA	Division III	Independent	7	2	0					—	—
1974	1974	Bob Ford	NCAA	Division III	Independent	9	0	0					—	—
1975	1975	Bob Ford	NCAA	Division III	Independent	7	2	0					—	—
1976	1976	Bob Ford	NCAA	Division III	Independent	4	5	0					—	—
1977	1977	Bob Ford	NCAA	Division III	Independent	9	2	0					Lost NCAA Division III Semifinals	—
1978	1978	Bob Ford	NCAA	Division III	Independent	7	3	0					—	—
1979	1979	Bob Ford	NCAA	Division III	Independent	6	3	0					—	—
1980	1980	Bob Ford	NCAA	Division III	Independent	5	5	0					—	—
1981	1981	Bob Ford	NCAA	Division III	Independent	7	3	0					—	—
1982	1982	Bob Ford	NCAA	Division III	Independent	6	3	0					—	—
1983	1983	Bob Ford	NCAA	Division III	Independent	3	7	0					—	—
1984	1984	Bob Ford	NCAA	Division III	Independent	5	5	0					—	—
1985	1985	Bob Ford	NCAA	Division III	Independent	9	2	0					—	—
1986	1986	Bob Ford	NCAA	Division III	Independent	4	6	0					—	—
1987	1987	Bob Ford	NCAA	Division III	Independent	5	5	0					—	—
1988	1988	Bob Ford	NCAA	Division III	Independent	5	5	0					—	—
1989	1989	Bob Ford	NCAA	Division III	Independent	5	4	0					—	—
1990	1990	Bob Ford	NCAA	Division III	Independent	3	7	0					—	—
1991	1991	Bob Ford	NCAA	Division III	Independent	5	5	0					—	—
1992	1992	Bob Ford	NCAA	Division III	Independent	6	4	0					—	—
1993	1993	Bob Ford	NCAA	Division III	Independent	6	4	0					—	—
1994	1994	Bob Ford	NCAA	Division III	Independent	4	6	0					—	—
1995	1995	Bob Ford	NCAA	Division II	Independent	3	7	0					—	—
1996	1996	Bob Ford	NCAA	Division II	Independent	7	3	0					—	—
1997	1997	Bob Ford	NCAA	Division II	Eastern	11	1	0	1st	8	0	0	—	—
1998	1998	Bob Ford	NCAA	Division II	Eastern	10	1	0	1st	7	1	0	—	—
1999	1999	Bob Ford	NCAA	Division I-AA	Northeast	7	2	0	2nd	6	1	0	—	—
2000	2000	Bob Ford	NCAA	Division I-AA	Northeast	5	6	0	4th	5	3	0	—	—
2001	2001	Bob Ford	NCAA	Division I-AA	Northeast	7	3	0	T–3rd	5	2	0	—	—
2002	2002	Bob Ford	NCAA	Division I-AA	Northeast	8	4	0	1st	6	1	0	—	—
2003	2003	Bob Ford	NCAA	Division I-AA	Northeast	7	4	0	T–1st	6	1	0	—	—
2004	2004	Bob Ford	NCAA	Division I-AA	Northeast	4	7	0	3rd	4	3	0	—	—
2005	2005	Bob Ford	NCAA	Division I-AA	Northeast	5	6	0	T–3rd	4	3	0	—	—
2006	2006	Bob Ford	NCAA	Division I FCS	Northeast	7	4	0	T–2nd	5	2	0	—	—
2007	2007	Bob Ford	NCAA	Division I FCS	Northeast	8	4	0	1st	6	0	0	—	—
2008	2008	Bob Ford	NCAA	Division I FCS	Northeast	9	3	0	1st	7	0	0	—	—
2009	2009	Bob Ford	NCAA	Division I FCS	Northeast	7	4	0	2nd	6	2	0	—	—
2010	2010	Bob Ford	NCAA	Division I FCS	Northeast	6	5	0	T–4th	4	4	0	—	—
2011	2011	Bob Ford	NCAA	Division I FCS	Northeast	8	4	0	T–1st	7	1	0	Lost NCAA Division I FCS First Round	—/#23
2012	2012	Bob Ford	NCAA	Division I FCS	Northeast	9	2	0	T–1st	7	1	0	—	—
2013	2013	Bob Ford	NCAA	Division I FCS	CAA	1	11	0	11th	0	8	0	—	—
2014	2014	Greg Gattuso	NCAA	Division I FCS	CAA	7	5	0	9th	3	5	0	—	—
2015	2015	Greg Gattuso	NCAA	Division I FCS	CAA	3	8	0	11th	2	6	0	—	—
2016	2016	Greg Gattuso	NCAA	Division I FCS	CAA	7	4	0	T–6th	4	4	0	—	—
2017	2017	Greg Gattuso	NCAA	Division I FCS	CAA	4	7	0	T–10th	2	6	0	—	—
2018	2018	Greg Gattuso	NCAA	Division I FCS	CAA	3	8	0	12th	1	7	0	—	—
2019	2019	Greg Gattuso	NCAA	Division I FCS	CAA	9	5	0	2nd	6	2	0	Lost NCAA Division I FCS Second Round	#18/#20
2020	2020	Greg Gattuso	NCAA	Division I FCS	CAA	1	3	0	T–4th	1	3	0	—	—
2021	2021	Greg Gattuso	NCAA	Division I FCS	CAA	2	9	0	12th	1	7	0	—	—
2022	2022	Greg Gattuso	NCAA	Division I FCS	CAA	3	8	0	T–10th	2	6	0	—	—
2023	2023	Greg Gattuso	NCAA	Division I FCS	CAA	11	4	0	T–1st	7	1	0	Lost NCAA Division I FCS Semifinals	#5/#15
2024	2024	Greg Gattuso	NCAA	Division I FCS	CAA	4	8	0	T–12th	2	6	0	—	—
2025	2025	Jared Ambrose	NCAA	Division I FCS	CAA	2	10	0	T–12th	1	7	0	—	—
