= 2004 America East men's basketball tournament =

- Classification: Division I
- Season: 2003–04
- Champions: Vermont (2nd title)
- Winning coach: Tom Brennan (2nd title)
- MVP: Taylor Coppenrath (Vermont)

2003–04 America East Conference men's basketball standings
	Conf.				Overall
Team	W		L	PCT	W		L	PCT
Boston University	17	–	1	.944	23	–	6	.793
Vermont †	15	–	3	.833	22	–	9	.710
Northeastern	13	–	5	.722	19	–	11	.633
Maine	12	–	6	.667	20	–	10	.667
Binghamton	10	–	8	.556	14	–	16	.467
Hartford	6	–	12	.333	12	–	17	.414
New Hampshire	5	–	13	.278	10	–	20	.333
Stony Brook	5	–	13	.278	10	–	20	.333
UMBC	4	–	14	.222	7	–	21	.250
Albany	3	–	15	.167	5	–	23	.179
† 2004 America East tournament winner

The 2004 America East men's basketball tournament was hosted by the Boston University Terriers at Walter Brown Arena. The final was held at Patrick Gym on the campus of the University of Vermont, and was the first basketball game held in the state of Vermont to be nationally televised, airing on ESPN. Vermont gained its second consecutive conference tournament win and NCAA tournament berth with its win over Maine. Vermont was given the 15th seed in the West Regional of the NCAA Tournament and lost in the first round to Connecticut 70–53. Boston University gained a bid to the NIT and lost in the opening round to Rhode Island 80–52.

== Bracket and Results ==
First round
8	Stony Brook	65
9	UMBC	59
7	New Hampshire	43
10	Albany	38

Second round
1	Boston University	58
8	Stony Brook	62
4	Maine	79*
5	Binghamton	77
2	Vermont	58
7	New Hampshire	50
3	Northeastern	74
6	Hartford	79

Semifinals
4	Maine	74
8	Stony Brook	54
2	Vermont	61
6	Hartford	48

Finals
4	Maine	53
2	Vermont	72

* Game Ended in Overtime

== See also ==
- America East Conference
