= 2002–03 Vermont Catamounts men's basketball team =

American college basketball season

2002–03 Vermont Catamounts men's basketball

America East tournament champions

NCAA tournament, first round
- Conference: America East Conference
- Record: 21–12 (11–5 America East)
- Head coach: Tom Brennan (17th season)
- Home arena: Patrick Gym

2002–03 America East Conference men's basketball standings
	Conf.				Overall
Team	W		L	PCT	W		L	PCT
Boston University	13	–	3	.813	20	–	11	.645
Vermont †	11	–	5	.688	21	–	12	.636
Hartford	10	–	6	.625	16	–	13	.552
Binghamton	9	–	7	.563	14	–	13	.519
Maine	8	–	8	.500	14	–	16	.467
Northeastern	8	–	8	.500	16	–	15	.516
Stony Brook	7	–	9	.438	13	–	15	.464
Albany	3	–	13	.188	7	–	21	.250
New Hampshire	3	–	13	.188	5	–	23	.179
† 2003 America East tournament winner

The 2002–03 Vermont Catamounts men's basketball team represented the University of Vermont during the 2002–03 NCAA Division I men's basketball season. The Catamounts, led by head coach Tom Brennan – coaching in his 17th season, played their home games at Patrick Gym and were members of the America East Conference. They finished the season 21–12, 11–5 in America East play to finish second in the conference regular season standings. They followed that success by winning the America East tournament to earn an automatic bid to the NCAA tournament. Playing as the No. 16 seed in the West region, the Catamounts were defeated by No. 1 seed Arizona in the opening round.

This marked the first of three straight seasons the Catamounts played in the NCAA Tournament.

== Roster ==
2002–03 Vermont Catamounts men's basketball team
Players
Coaches

Pos.	#	Name	Height	Weight	Year	Previous school	Hometown
G	11	T. J. Sorrentine	5 ft 11 in (1.8 m)	185 lb (84 kg)	So	St. Raphael Academy	Pawtucket, Rhode Island
F	22	Taylor Coppenrath	6 ft 9 in (2.06 m)	240 lb (109 kg)	So	St. Johnsbury Academy	Barnet, Vermont

Head coach

- Tom Brennan

Assistant coach(es)

Legend

- (C) Team captain
- (S) Suspended
- (I) Ineligible
- (W) Walk-on
- Injured
- Current redshirt

Roster

== Schedule and results ==
Date time, TV	Rank^{#}	Opponent^{#}	Result	Record	Site (attendance) city, state
Regular season
Nov 29, 2002*		vs. Utah State	L 59–62	3–1	Afook-Chinen Civic Auditorium (500); Hilo, Hawaii
Dec 19, 2002*		at No. 23 North Carolina	L 54–80	3–6	Dean Smith Center (16,258); Chapel Hill, North Carolina
America East tournament
Mar 9, 2003*		vs. Albany; Quarterfinals	W 81–62	19–11	Walter Brown Arena (NA); Boston, Massachusetts
Mar 10, 2003*		vs. Hartford; Semifinals	W 67–51	20–11	Walter Brown Arena (1,512); Boston, Massachusetts
Mar 15, 2003*		at Boston University; Championship game	W 56–55	21–11	Case Gym (1,738); Boston, Massachusetts
NCAA Tournament
Mar 20, 2003*	(16 W)	vs. (1 W) No. 2 Arizona; First round	L 51–80	21–12	Jon M. Huntsman Center (14,378); Salt Lake City, Utah
*Non-conference game. ^{#}Rankings from AP Poll. (#) Tournament seedings in parentheses. W=West. All times are in Eastern Time.

== Awards and honors ==
- Taylor Coppenrath – America East Player of the Year
