= 2003–04 Vermont Catamounts men's basketball team =

American college basketball season

2003–04 Vermont Catamounts men's basketball

America East tournament champions

NCAA tournament, second round
- Conference: America East Conference
- Record: 22–9 (15–3 America East)
- Head coach: Tom Brennan (18th season)
- Home arena: Patrick Gym

2003–04 America East Conference men's basketball standings
	Conf.				Overall
Team	W		L	PCT	W		L	PCT
Boston University	17	–	1	.944	23	–	6	.793
Vermont †	15	–	3	.833	22	–	9	.710
Northeastern	13	–	5	.722	19	–	11	.633
Maine	12	–	6	.667	20	–	10	.667
Binghamton	10	–	8	.556	14	–	16	.467
Hartford	6	–	12	.333	12	–	17	.414
New Hampshire	5	–	13	.278	10	–	20	.333
Stony Brook	5	–	13	.278	10	–	20	.333
UMBC	4	–	14	.222	7	–	21	.250
Albany	3	–	15	.167	5	–	23	.179
† 2004 America East tournament winner

The 2003–04 Vermont Catamounts men's basketball team represented the University of Vermont during the 2003–04 NCAA Division I men's basketball season. The Catamounts, led by head coach Tom Brennan – coaching in his 18th season, played their home games at Patrick Gym and were members of the America East Conference. They finished the season 22–9, 15–3 in America East play to finish second in the regular season standings. They won the America East tournament to earn an automatic bid to the NCAA tournament. Playing as the No. 15 seed in the Phoenix region, the Catamounts lost to No. 2 seed and eventual National champion UConn in the opening round.

This season marked the second of three straight seasons the Catamounts played in the NCAA Tournament.

== Roster ==
2003–04 Vermont Catamounts men's basketball team
Players
Coaches

Pos.	#	Name	Height	Weight	Year	Previous school	Hometown
G	11	T. J. Sorrentine	5 ft 11 in (1.8 m)	185 lb (84 kg)	Jr	St. Raphael Academy	Pawtucket, Rhode Island
F	22	Taylor Coppenrath	6 ft 9 in (2.06 m)	240 lb (109 kg)	Jr	St. Johnsbury Academy	Barnet, Vermont

Head coach

- Tom Brennan

Assistant coach(es)

Legend

- (C) Team captain
- (S) Suspended
- (I) Ineligible
- (W) Walk-on
- Injured
- Current redshirt

Roster

== Schedule and results ==
Date time, TV	Rank^{#}	Opponent^{#}	Result	Record	Site (attendance) city, state
Regular season
Nov 17, 2003*		at Nevada	L 49–69	0–1	Lawlor Events Center (4,763); Reno, Nevada
Nov 24, 2003*		vs. Iona	L 53–56	0–2	Westchester County Center (2,700); White Plains, New York
Nov 29, 2003*		at UCLA	L 67–68	0–3	Pauley Pavilion (7,852); Los Angeles, California
Dec 2, 2003*		at UMass	L 64–76	0–4	Mullins Center (2,358); Amherst, Massachusetts
Dec 5, 2003*		Cornell	W 73–60	1–4	Patrick Gym (2,622); Burlington, Vermont
Dec 14, 2003*		Harvard	W 48–42	2–4	Patrick Gym (1,432); Burlington, Vermont
Dec 21, 2003*		at Marist	W 62–57	3–4	McCann Arena (2,175); Poughkeepsie, New York
Dec 30, 2003*		at Rhode Island	L 56–94	3–5	Thomas M. Ryan Center (6,491); Kingston, Rhode Island
Jan 2, 2004		at Binghamton	W 67–60	4–5 (1–0)	West Gym (2,003); Binghamton, New York
Jan 4, 2004		at UMBC	W 67–66	5–5 (2–0)	RAC Arena (1,247); Catonsville, Maryland
Jan 7, 2004		Northeastern	W 88–78	6–5 (3–0)	Patrick Gym (2,341); Burlington, Vermont
Jan 11, 2004		at Maine	W 71–62	7–5 (4–0)	Alfond Arena (2,103); Orono, Maine
Jan 14, 2004		Stony Brook	W 77–70	8–5 (5–0)	Patrick Gym (2,332); Burlington, Vermont
Jan 17, 2004		at Boston University	W 59–57	9–5 (6–0)	Case Gym (1,575); Boston, Massachusetts
Jan 21, 2004*		at Dartmouth	W 76–66	10–5	Leede Arena (1,421); Hanover, New Hampshire
America East tournament
Mar 6, 2004*		vs. New Hampshire; Quarterfinals	W 58–50	20–8	Walter Brown Arena (1,877); Boston, Massachusetts
Mar 7, 2004*		vs. Hartford; Semifinals	W 61–48	21–8	Walter Brown Arena (2,262); Boston, Massachusetts
Mar 13, 2004*		Maine; Championship game	W 72–53	22–8	Patrick Gym (3,228); Burlington, Vermont
NCAA Tournament
Mar 18, 2004*; CBS	(15 PHX)	vs. (2 PHX) No. 7 Connecticut; First round	L 53–70	22–9	HSBC Arena (18,686); Buffalo, New York
*Non-conference game. ^{#}Rankings from AP Poll. (#) Tournament seedings in parentheses. PHX=Phoenix. All times are in Eastern Time.

== Awards and honors ==
- Taylor Coppenrath – America East Player of the Year (2x)
