= List of Dartmouth Big Green men's basketball head coaches =

The following is a list of Dartmouth Big Green men's basketball head coaches. There have been 28 head coaches of the Big Green in their 121-season history.

Dartmouth's current head coach is David McLaughlin. He was hired as the Big Green's head coach in April 2016, replacing Paul Cormier, who was fired after the 2015–16 season.

No.	Tenure	Coach	Years	Record	Pct.
–	1900–1906; 1907–1909	No coach	8	96–49–1	.661
1	1906–1907	Henry Lane	1	13–4	.765
2	1909–1910	Benjamin Lang	1	6–4	.600
3	1910–1911	Tom Keady	1	5–6	.455
4	1911–1912	Francis Brady	1	9–5	.643
5	1912–1913	James Mullen	1	4–8	.333
6	1913–1914	C. A. Reed	1	4–13	.235
7	1914–1916	Paul Loudon	2	17–23	.425
8	1916–1917	J. A. Pelletier	1	10–12	.455
9	1917–1918	Mysterious Walker	1	0–26	.000
10	1919–1924	George Zahn	5	57–52	.523
11	1924–1928	Lew Wachter	4	59–26	.694
12	1928–1936	Dolly Stark	8	101–60	.627
13	1936–1943; 1944–1946	Osborne Cowles	9	147–47	.758
14	1943–1944	Earl Brown	1	19–2	.905
15	1946–1950	Elmer A. Lampe	4	45–55	.450
16	1950–1966 (Note: Julian suffered a stroke on December 28, 1966. Gavitt took over as head coach on a permanent basis starting January 6, 1967.)	Doggie Julian	17	183–236	.437
17	1967–1969	Dave Gavitt	3	20–48	.294
18	1969–1972	George Blaney	3	37–40	.481
19	1972–1974	Tom O'Connor	2	10–42	.192
20	1974–1975	Marcus Jackson	1	8–18	.308
21	1975–1979	Gary Walters	4	44–60	.423
22	1979–1983	Tim Cohane	4	30–74	.288
23	1983–1984	Reggie Minton	1	11–15	.423
24	1984–1991; 2010–2016	Paul Cormier	13	142–211	.402
25	1991–2004	Dave Faucher	13	136–208	.395
26	2004–2010 (Note: Dunn resigned as head coach in January 2010. Graupe was named interim head coach for the remainder of the 2009–10 season.)	Terry Dunn	6	47–103	.313
27	2010*	Mark Graupe	1	2–13	.133
28	2016–present (Note: Dartmouth's 2020–21 season was cancelled due to the COVID-19 pandemic.)	David McLaughlin	6	56–110	.337
Totals		28 coaches	121 seasons	1,317–1,572–1	.456
Records updated through end of 2022–23 season * - Denotes interim head coach. Source
