= SGO =

SGO may refer to:

- SG Oslebshausen, a former basketball club
- St George Airport (Queensland) (IATA code)
- station code for Saugor railway station, a main Indian railway station
- Society of Gynecologic Oncology, an American medical association
