= 2002 America East men's basketball tournament =

- Classification: Division I
- Season: 2001–02
- Champions: Boston University (5th title)
- Winning coach: Dennis Wolff (2nd title)
- MVP: Billy Collins (Boston U.)

2001–02 America East Conference men's basketball standings
	Conf.				Overall
Team	W		L	PCT	W		L	PCT
Vermont	13	–	3	.813	21	–	8	.724
Boston University †	13	–	3	.813	22	–	10	.688
Hartford	10	–	6	.625	14	–	18	.438
New Hampshire	8	–	8	.500	11	–	17	.393
Maine	7	–	9	.438	12	–	18	.400
Binghamton	6	–	10	.375	9	–	19	.321
Albany	5	–	11	.313	8	–	20	.286
Northeastern	5	–	11	.313	7	–	21	.250
Stony Brook	5	–	11	.313	6	–	22	.214
† 2002 America East tournament winner

The 2002 America East men's basketball tournament was hosted by the Northeastern Huskies at Matthews Arena. The final was held at Case Gym on the campus of Boston University. Boston University gained its fifth America East Championship and an automatic berth to the NCAA tournament with its win over Maine. BU was given the 16th seed in the West Regional of the NCAA Tournament and lost in the first round to Cincinnati 90–52.

== Bracket and Results ==
Quarterfinals
1	Vermont	74
8	Stony Brook	59
4	New Hampshire	48
5	Maine	54
3	Hartford	65
6	UAlbany	49
2	Boston University	86
7	Northeastern	76

Semifinals
1	Vermont	59^{OT}
5	Maine	61
3	Hartford	60
2	Boston U.	63

Finals
5	Maine	40
2	Boston U.	66

== See also ==
- America East Conference
