= 2001–02 Charlotte 49ers men's basketball team =

American college basketball season

2001–02 Charlotte 49ers men's basketball
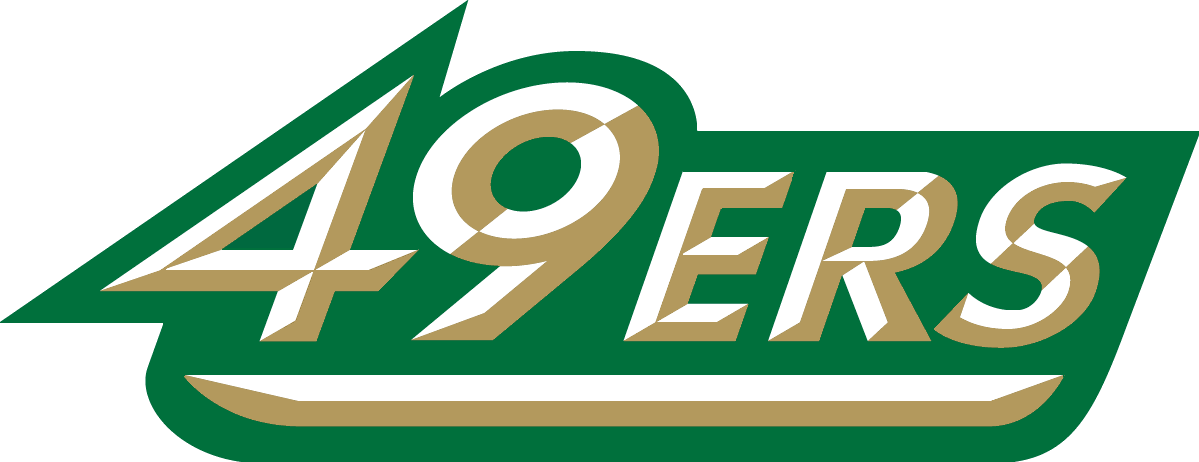

NCAA tournament first round
- Conference: Conference USA
- American
- Record: 18–12 (11–5 C-USA)
- Head coach: Bobby Lutz (4th season)
- Assistant coach: Benny Moss (2nd season)
- Home arena: Dale F. Halton Arena

2001–02 Conference USA men's basketball standings
	Conf.				Overall
Team	W		L	PCT	W		L	PCT
American
No. 5 Cincinnati †	14	–	2	.875	31	–	4	.886
No. 12 Marquette	13	–	3	.813	26	–	7	.788
Charlotte	11	–	5	.688	18	–	12	.600
Saint Louis	9	–	7	.563	15	–	16	.484
Louisville	8	–	8	.500	19	–	13	.594
East Carolina	5	–	11	.313	12	–	18	.400
DePaul	2	–	14	.125	9	–	19	.321
National
Memphis	12	–	4	.750	27	–	9	.750
Houston	9	–	7	.563	18	–	15	.545
South Florida	8	–	8	.500	19	–	13	.594
TCU	6	–	10	.375	16	–	15	.516
UAB	6	–	10	.375	13	–	17	.433
Tulane	5	–	11	.313	14	–	15	.483
Southern Miss	4	–	12	.250	10	–	17	.370
† 2002 Conference USA Tournament winner Rankings from AP Poll

The 2001–02 UNC Charlotte 49ers men's basketball team represented the University of North Carolina at Charlotte during the 2001–02 college basketball season. This was head coach Bobby Lutz's fourth season at the school. The 49ers competed in Conference USA and played their home games at Dale F. Halton Arena.

They finished the season 18–12 (11–5 in C-USA play) and received an at-large bid to the 2002 NCAA tournament as No. 9 seed in the South region. The 49ers were defeated by No. 8 seed Notre Dame, 82–63, in the first round.

== Roster ==
2001–02 Charlotte 49ers men's basketball team
Players
Coaches

Pos.	#	Name	Height	Weight	Year	Previous school	Hometown
G/F	1	Curtis Nash	6 ft 6 in (1.98 m)	—	Jr		Fort Worth, Texas
C	3	Jermaine Williams	6 ft 10 in (2.08 m)	—	Sr	South Garland	Dallas, Texas
F/C	10	Cam Stephens	6 ft 8 in (2.03 m)	—	Sr	Fort Wayne South	Fort Wayne, Indiana
G	11	Demon Brown	6 ft 1 in (1.85 m)	195 lb (88 kg)	RS So	Maine Central School	Baltimore, Maryland
F	12	Butter Johnson	6 ft 8 in (2.03 m)	—	So	Milford Academy	Bronx, New York
F	12	Matas Niparavicius	6 ft 9 in (2.06 m)	—	So		Elektrenai, Lithuania
G/F	13	Eddie Basden	6 ft 5 in (1.96 m)	215 lb (98 kg)	Fr	Eleanor Roosevelt	Greenbelt, Maryland
G	20	Mitchell Baldwin	6 ft 2 in (1.88 m)	—	Fr	Winston-Salem Reynolds	Rural Hall, North Carolina
G	21	Chris Sager	6 ft 4 in (1.93 m)	—	So	Pius XI	Waukesha, Wisconsin
G	31	Jobey Thomas	6 ft 4 in (1.93 m)	195 lb (88 kg)	Sr	Independence	Charlotte, North Carolina
F	35	Calvin Clemmons	6 ft 8 in (2.03 m)	—	Jr	Olympic	Charlotte, North Carolina
G	40	Colon Largent	6 ft 3 in (1.91 m)	—	Sr	Foard	Hickory, North Carolina
G	41	Chris Howard	6 ft 3 in (1.91 m)	—	So	Ben L. Smith	Greensboro, North Carolina
F	42	David Hardy	6 ft 8 in (2.03 m)	—	RS Fr	Central Cabarrus	Harrisburg, North Carolina
F	55	Tory Reed	6 ft 8 in (2.03 m)	—	So	Maine Central School	Cleveland, Ohio

Head coach

- Bobby Lutz

Assistant coach(es)

- Benny Moss (Pfeiffer)

Legend

- (C) Team captain
- (S) Suspended
- (I) Ineligible
- (W) Walk-on
- Injured
- Current redshirt

Roster

== Schedule and results ==
Date time, TV	Rank^{#}	Opponent^{#}	Result	Record	Site city, state
Regular season
Nov 16, 2001*; 8:05 p.m.		Davidson	W 65–51	1–0	Dale F. Halton Arena; Charlotte, North Carolina
Nov 18, 2001*; 7:30 p.m.		No. 22 Indiana	L 61–65	1–1	Dale F. Halton Arena; Charlotte, North Carolina
Nov 24, 2001*; 4:05 p.m.		at Long Beach State	W 100–81	2–1	The Long Beach Pyramid; Long Beach, California
Nov 26, 2001*; 7:30 p.m.		Appalachian State	W 71–69	3–1	Dale F. Halton Arena; Charlotte, North Carolina
Nov 29, 2001*; 7:00 p.m.		at Temple	L 64–72	3–2	Liacouras Center; Philadelphia, Pennsylvania
Dec 5, 2001*; 7:30 p.m.		Valparaiso	L 63–70	3–3	Dale F. Halton Arena; Charlotte, North Carolina
Dec 8, 2001*; 7:30 p.m.		Richmond	W 62–42	4–3	Dale F. Halton Arena; Charlotte, North Carolina
Dec 15, 2001*; 7:30 p.m.		vs. No. 5 Florida; Orange Bowl Basketball Classic	L 52–73	4–4	American Airlines Arena; Miami, Florida
Dec 18, 2001*; 7:30 p.m.		UTEP	W 86–58	5–4	Dale F. Halton Arena; Charlotte, North Carolina
Dec 22, 2001*; 7:30 p.m.		at Miami (FL)	L 56–64	5–5	Miami Arena; Miami, Florida
Dec 29, 2001*; 2:00 p.m.		at George Washington	W 97–87	6–5	Charles E. Smith Center; Washington, D.C.
Jan 5, 2002; 7:30 p.m.		No. 25 Marquette	W 76–68	7–5 (1–0)	Dale F. Halton Arena; Charlotte, North Carolina
Jan 8, 2002; 8:05 p.m.		at No. 12 Cincinnati	L 58–71	7–6 (1–1)	Myrl Shoemaker Center; Cincinnati, Ohio
Jan 12, 2002; 12:00 p.m.		at East Carolina	W 84–75	8–6 (2–1)	Williams Arena at Minges Coliseum; Greenville, North Carolina
Jan 15, 2002; 7:30 p.m.		Saint Louis	W 77–49	9–6 (3–1)	Dale F. Halton Arena; Charlotte, North Carolina
Jan 18, 2002; 7:00 p.m.		at South Florida	W 81–78	10–6 (4–1)	Sun Dome; Tampa, Florida
Jan 23, 2002; 7:30 p.m.		Louisville	W 77–71	11–6 (5–1)	Dale F. Halton Arena; Charlotte, North Carolina
Jan 26, 2002; 3:00 p.m.		East Carolina	W 87–52	12–6 (6–1)	Dale F. Halton Arena; Charlotte, North Carolina
Jan 29, 2002; 8:30 p.m.		at DePaul	W 97–83	13–6 (7–1)	United Center; Chicago, Illinois
Feb 2, 2002; 8:00 p.m.		at Houston	W 83–68	14–6 (8–1)	Hofheinz Pavilion; Houston, Texas
Feb 6, 2002; ESPN2		No. 6 Cincinnati	L 66–85	14–7 (8–2)	Dale F. Halton Arena; Charlotte, North Carolina
Feb 9, 2002; 1:00 p.m.		at Saint Louis	L 54–73	14–8 (8–3)	Scottrade Center; St. Louis, Missouri
Feb 13, 2002; 9:30 p.m.		Memphis	W 75–63	15–8 (9–3)	Dale F. Halton Arena; Charlotte, North Carolina
Feb 16, 2002; 12:00 p.m.		DePaul	W 81–57	16–8 (10–3)	Dale F. Halton Arena; Charlotte, North Carolina
Feb 19, 2002; 8:00 p.m.		at No. 9 Marquette	L 52–66	16–9 (10–4)	Bradley Center; Milwaukee, Wisconsin
Feb 23, 2002; 2:00 p.m.		Tulane	W 81–57	17–9 (11–4)	Dale F. Halton Arena; Charlotte, North Carolina
Mar 2, 2002; 12:00 p.m.		at Louisville	L 88–90 ^{OT}	17–10 (11–5)	Freedom Hall; Louisville, Kentucky
C-USA tournament
Mar 7, 2002*; 9:30 p.m.	(4)	vs. (12) Tulane; Quarterfinals	W 78–69	18–10	Riverfront Coliseum; Cincinnati, Ohio
Mar 8, 2002*; 7:30 p.m.	(4)	at (1) No. 5 Cincinnati; Semifinals	L 55–71	18–11	Riverfront Coliseum; Cincinnati, Ohio
NCAA tournament
Mar 14, 2002*; 7:40 p.m.	(9 S)	vs. (8 S) Notre Dame; First round	L 63–82	18–12	BI-LO Center; Greenville, South Carolina
*Non-conference game. ^{#}Rankings from AP poll. (#) Tournament seedings in parentheses. S=South. All times are in Eastern Time.
