= 2001–02 Louisville Cardinals men's basketball team =

American college basketball season

2001–02 Louisville Cardinals men's basketball
- Conference: Conference USA
- Record: 19–13 (8–8 CUSA)
- Head coach: Rick Pitino (1st season)
- Home arena: Freedom Hall

2001–02 Conference USA men's basketball standings
	Conf.				Overall
Team	W		L	PCT	W		L	PCT
American
No. 5 Cincinnati †	14	–	2	.875	31	–	4	.886
No. 12 Marquette	13	–	3	.813	26	–	7	.788
Charlotte	11	–	5	.688	18	–	12	.600
Saint Louis	9	–	7	.563	15	–	16	.484
Louisville	8	–	8	.500	19	–	13	.594
East Carolina	5	–	11	.313	12	–	18	.400
DePaul	2	–	14	.125	9	–	19	.321
National
Memphis	12	–	4	.750	27	–	9	.750
Houston	9	–	7	.563	18	–	15	.545
South Florida	8	–	8	.500	19	–	13	.594
TCU	6	–	10	.375	16	–	15	.516
UAB	6	–	10	.375	13	–	17	.433
Tulane	5	–	11	.313	14	–	15	.483
Southern Miss	4	–	12	.250	10	–	17	.370
† 2002 Conference USA Tournament winner Rankings from AP Poll

The 2001–02 Louisville Cardinals men's basketball team represented the University of Louisville in the 2001–02 NCAA Division I men's basketball season, the 88th season of interleague play for the Cardinals. The head coach was Rick Pitino and the team finished the season with an overall record of 19–13. Their longest winning streak was an 8-game streak and the Cardinals never lost more than 3 games in a row.

This was Pitino's first season as Louisville's head coach. Pitino replaced Denny Crum at the end of the 2000–01 season and he made his coaching debut for the Cardinals on October 31, 2001, in an exhibition match against EA Sports with an 81–63 victory.

== Preseason ==
=== September 11 attacks ===
During the September 11 attacks, Pitino lost Bill Minardi, his brother-in-law, who was working on the 105th floor of the North Tower for Cantor Fitzgerald on the morning of the attacks.

=== EA Sports Exhibition ===
On October 31, 2001, Louisville played the EA Sports All-Stars in an exhibition game at Freedom Hall. The Cardinals won 81–63 and this was the debut for new head coach Rick Pitino.

== Regular season ==
The Cardinals finished the regular season with a record of 17–11, including an 8–8 conference record and appearances in two tournaments. Their longest winning streak included an eight-game winning streak and their longest losing streak was a three-game losing streak.

== Postseason and Tournaments ==
During the postseason, the Cardinals played in the Conference USA tournament and the National Invitation Tournament.

In the CUSA tournament, the Cardinals defeated Texas Christian 110–86 on March 5, 2002, but were defeated by Marquette the next day with a score of 84–76.

On March 12, the team starts the NIT Tournament by defeating Princeton 66–65 but were defeated by Temple 65–62 a week later, finishing the Cardinal's season with an overall record of 19–13. Their game against Princeton was won by a banked jumper by Reece Gaines with 5.3 seconds left in the game.
