= 2001–02 Marquette Golden Eagles men's basketball team =

American college basketball season

2001–02 Marquette Golden Eagles men's basketball

Great Alaska Shootout champions

NCAA tournament, first round
- Conference: Conference USA

Ranking
- Coaches: No. 18
- AP: No. 12
- Record: 26–7 (13–3 C-USA)
- Head coach: Tom Crean (3rd season)
- Assistant coaches: Darrin Horn (3rd season); Tod Kowalczyk (2nd season); Dwayne Stephens (3rd season)
- Home arena: Bradley Center

2001–02 Conference USA men's basketball standings
	Conf.				Overall
Team	W		L	PCT	W		L	PCT
American
No. 5 Cincinnati †	14	–	2	.875	31	–	4	.886
No. 12 Marquette	13	–	3	.813	26	–	7	.788
Charlotte	11	–	5	.688	18	–	12	.600
Saint Louis	9	–	7	.563	15	–	16	.484
Louisville	8	–	8	.500	19	–	13	.594
East Carolina	5	–	11	.313	12	–	18	.400
DePaul	2	–	14	.125	9	–	19	.321
National
Memphis	12	–	4	.750	27	–	9	.750
Houston	9	–	7	.563	18	–	15	.545
South Florida	8	–	8	.500	19	–	13	.594
TCU	6	–	10	.375	16	–	15	.516
UAB	6	–	10	.375	13	–	17	.433
Tulane	5	–	11	.313	14	–	15	.483
Southern Miss	4	–	12	.250	10	–	17	.370
† 2002 Conference USA Tournament winner Rankings from AP Poll

The 2001–02 Marquette Golden Eagles men's basketball team represented the Marquette University in the 2001–02 season. Their head coach was Tom Crean. They received the conference's automatic bid to the NCAA Tournament where they lost in the first round to Tulsa.

== Roster ==
2001–02 Marquette Golden Eagles men's basketball team
Players
Coaches

Pos.	#	Name	Height	Weight	Year	Hometown
G	10	Travis Diener	6 ft 1 in (1.85 m)	175 lb (79 kg)	Fr	Fond du Lac, Wisconsin
G	4	Cordell Henry	5 ft 10 in (1.78 m)	160 lb (73 kg)	Sr	Chicago, Illinois
G	30	Ron Howard	6 ft 5 in (1.96 m)	170 lb (77 kg)	Fr	Chicago, Illinois
F	55	Robert Jackson	6 ft 10 in (2.08 m)	260 lb (118 kg)	RS Sr	Milwaukee, Wisconsin
C	5	Scott Merritt	6 ft 10 in (2.08 m)	245 lb (111 kg)	So	Wauwatosa, Wisconsin
F	40	Terry Sanders	6 ft 8 in (2.03 m)	225 lb (102 kg)	So	Milwaukee, Wisconsin
F	1	Todd Townsend	6 ft 7 in (2.01 m)	215 lb (98 kg)	Fr	Chicago, Illinois
G	3	Dwyane Wade	6 ft 4 in (1.93 m)	180 lb (82 kg)	So	Chicago, Illinois

Head coach

- Tom Crean

Assistant coach(es)

- Darrin Horn
- Tod Kowalczyk
- Dwayne Stephens

Legend

- (C) Team captain
- (S) Suspended
- (I) Ineligible
- (W) Walk-on
- Injured
- Current redshirt

Roster

== Schedule and results ==
Date time, TV	Rank^{#}	Opponent^{#}	Result	Record	Site city, state
November 17*		Loyola (IL)	W 80–70	1–0	Bradley Center; Milwaukee, Wisconsin
November 18*		Chicago State	W 102–49	2–0	Bradley Center; Milwaukee, Wisconsin
November 21*		vs. Tennessee; Great Alaska Shootout	W 85–74	3–0	Sullivan Arena; Anchorage, Alaska
November 23*		vs. No. 20 Indiana; Great Alaska Shootout	W 50–49	4–0	Sullivan Arena; Anchorage, Alaska
November 24*		vs. Gonzaga; Great Alaska Shootout	W 72–63	5–0	Sullivan Arena; Anchorage, Alaska
November 30*	No. 23	Texas Southern	W 76–40	6–0	Bradley Center; Milwaukee, Wisconsin
December 1*	No. 23	Sam Houston State	W 77–58	7–0	Bradley Center; Milwaukee, Wisconsin
December 5*	No. 17	Dayton	W 73–51	8–0	Bradley Center; Milwaukee, Wisconsin
December 8*	No. 17	Fordham	W 79–55	9–0	Bradley Center; Milwaukee, Wisconsin
December 19*	No. 14	Arkansas-Pine Bluff	W 100–49	10–0	Milwaukee Arena; Milwaukee, Wisconsin
December 22*	No. 14	at Wisconsin	L 73–86	10–1	Kohl Center; Madison, Wisconsin
December 29*	No. 19	at No. 25 Wake Forest	L 59–64	10–2	Lawrence Joel Coliseum; Winston-Salem, NC
January 2*	No. 25	Morris Brown	W 85–38	11–2	Bradley Center; Milwaukee, Wisconsin
January 5	No. 25	at Charlotte	L 68–76	11–3 (0–1)	Dale F. Halton Arena; Charlotte, NC
January 9		at Louisville	W 75–71	12–3 (1–1)	Freedom Hall; Louisville, Kentucky
January 12		Saint Louis	W 61–53	13–3 (2–1)	Bradley Center; Milwaukee, Wisconsin
January 15		Alabama-Birmingham	W 67–59	14–3 (3–1)	Bradley Center; Milwaukee, Wisconsin
January 19		at DePaul	W 87–68	15–3 (4–1)	Allstate Arena; Rosemont, Illinois
January 23		TCU	W 83–72	16–3 (5–1)	Bradley Center; Milwaukee, Wisconsin
January 26		at Saint Louis	W 55–38	17–3 (6–1)	Scottrade Center; St. Louis, Missouri
January 29		at Tulane	W 68–66	18–3 (7–1)	Avron B. Fogelman Arena; New Orleans, Louisiana
February 2		Cincinnati	W 74–60	19–3 (8–1)	Bradley Center; Milwaukee, Wisconsin
February 6		East Carolina	W 70–58	20–3 (9–1)	Bradley Center; Milwaukee, Wisconsin
February 9		at Southern Mississippi	W 72–58	21–3 (10–1)	Reed Green Coliseum; Hattiesburg, Mississippi
February 16		Louisville	W 75–63	22–3 (11–1)	Bradley Center; Milwaukee, Wisconsin
February 19		Charlotte	W 66–52	23–3 (12–1)	Bradley Center; Milwaukee, Wisconsin
February 22		at Cincinnati	L 62–63	23–4 (12–2)	Fifth Third Arena; Cincinnati, Ohio
February 26		at East Carolina	L 46–51	23–5 (12–3)	Williams Arena at Minges Coliseum; Greenville, NC
March 1		DePaul	W 72–53	24–5 (13–3)	Bradley Center; Milwaukee, Wisconsin
Conference USA tournament
March 7	(2) No. 13	vs. (7) Louisville; Quarterfinal	W 84–76	25–5	Riverfront Coliseum; Cincinnati, Ohio
March 8	(2) No. 13	vs. (6) Houston; Semifinal	W 85–73	26–5	Riverfront Coliseum; Cincinnati, Ohio
March 9	(2) No. 13	vs. (1) No. 5 Cincinnati; Finals	L 63–77	26–6	Riverfront Coliseum; Cincinnati, Ohio
NCAA tournament
March 14*	(5 E) No. 12	vs. (12 E) Tulsa; First Round	L 69–71	26–7	Edward Jones Dome; St. Louis, Missouri
*Non-conference game. ^{#}Rankings from AP poll. (#) Tournament seedings in parentheses. E=East.
