= Doc Sauers =

American college basketball coach (1930–2026)

Richard "Doc" Sauers (April 3, 1930 – April 27, 2026) was an American college basketball coach who coached the Albany Great Danes men's basketball team from 1955 to 1997 (except for 1987–88), a total of 41 years. With 702 victories, Sauers is among the top 40 winningest colleges coaches in NCAA history.

== Biography ==
Sauers came to what was then New York State College for Teachers at Albany in 1955, and was on hand for its eventual evolution into the University at Albany. He garnered eleven NCAA and four NAIA post-season tournament appearances. During his tenure, the basketball program moved from the NCAA's College Division to Division III and then to Division II, while the nickname was changed from the Pedagogues to the Great Danes.

From 1975 to 1995, the Great Danes qualified for 10 NCAA tournaments. In 1993–94, UAlbany established a school record for victories with a 25–3 mark, and reached the Division III East Sectional final. UAlbany also qualified for the Eastern College Athletic Conference (ECAC) playoffs seven times and won a pair of championships in 1978 and 1989.

He guided the Great Danes to 20-win campaigns on 10 occasions, and his clubs reached the 17-victory plateau in 26 different seasons. He was named the 1985 NCAA Division III Coach of the Year after Albany went 22–6 and gained a national tournament berth. In 1994, he was chosen as both the East Region and New York State Coach of the Year for the third time in his career. Sauers was inducted into the New York State Basketball Hall of Fame in 1992. He is also enshrined by Slippery Rock University and the Capital District Sports Hall of Fame.

Sauers finished his career with a 702–330 record in 41 seasons. In his final season, UAlbany went 17–10 as a member of the New England Collegiate Conference, and rebounded from his lone losing record the previous year. At the time, Sauers was one of two active coaches with more than 40-plus seasons at the same school. He became the 15th person to coach his 1,000th game at the collegiate level in February 1996.

Soon after retiring as basketball coach, Sauers became coach of the women's golf team, leading it through its transition to Division I. He previously served as men's golf coach from 1962 to 1973 and as head baseball coach in 1958 and 1959. He retired in 2012 after spending 57 years at UAlbany.

Sauers died on April 27, 2026, at the age of 96.

== See also ==
- List of college men's basketball coaches with 600 wins
