= 2002 Conference USA men's basketball tournament =

- Classification: Division I
- Season: 2001–02
- Teams: 12
- Site: Firstar Center; Cincinnati, OH
- Champions: Cincinnati (3rd title)
- Winning coach: Bob Huggins (3rd title)
- MVP: Steve Logan (Cincinnati)

2001–02 Conference USA men's basketball standings
	Conf.				Overall
Team	W		L	PCT	W		L	PCT
American
No. 5 Cincinnati †	14	–	2	.875	31	–	4	.886
No. 12 Marquette	13	–	3	.813	26	–	7	.788
Charlotte	11	–	5	.688	18	–	12	.600
Saint Louis	9	–	7	.563	15	–	16	.484
Louisville	8	–	8	.500	19	–	13	.594
East Carolina	5	–	11	.313	12	–	18	.400
DePaul	2	–	14	.125	9	–	19	.321
National
Memphis	12	–	4	.750	27	–	9	.750
Houston	9	–	7	.563	18	–	15	.545
South Florida	8	–	8	.500	19	–	13	.594
TCU	6	–	10	.375	16	–	15	.516
UAB	6	–	10	.375	13	–	17	.433
Tulane	5	–	11	.313	14	–	15	.483
Southern Miss	4	–	12	.250	10	–	17	.370
† 2002 Conference USA Tournament winner Rankings from AP Poll

The 2002 Conference USA men's basketball tournament was held March 6–9 at the Firstar Center in Cincinnati, Ohio.

Top-seeded Cincinnati defeated Marquette in the championship game, 77–63, to clinch their third Conference USA men's tournament championship.

The Bearcats, in turn, received an automatic bid to the 2002 NCAA tournament. They were joined in the tournament by fellow C-USA members Marquette and Charlotte, both of whom earned at-large bids.

== Format ==
Conference USA added two new teams, East Carolina and TCU, bringing total membership to fourteen. ECU was placed in the American Division, and TCU into the National Division.

Even with the league expansion, there were no new changes to the tournament format. The top four teams were given byes into the quarterfinal round while the next eight teams were placed into the first round. The two teams at the bottom of the conference standings, therefore, did not qualify for the tournament. All remaining tournament seeds were determined by regular season conference records.

== Bracket ==
First round Wednesday, March 6
9	UAB	62
8	South Florida	65
5	Saint Louis	47
12	Tulane	50
11	East Carolina	49
6	Houston	58
7	Louisville	110
10	TCU	86

Quarterfinals; Thursday, March 7
1	#5 Cincinnati	79
8	South Florida	57
12	Tulane	69
4	Charlotte	78
3	Memphis	74
6	Houston	80
7	Louisville	76
2	#13 Marquette	84

Semifinals; Friday, March 8
1	#5 Cincinnati	71
4	Charlotte	55
6	Houston	73
2	#13 Marquette	85

Championship; Saturday, March 9
1	#5 Cincinnati	77
2	#13 Marquette	63
