= 2003 America East men's basketball tournament =

- Classification: Division I
- Season: 2002–03
- Champions: Vermont (1st title)
- Winning coach: Tom Brennan (1st title)
- MVP: Matt Sheftic (Vermont)

2002–03 America East Conference men's basketball standings
	Conf.				Overall
Team	W		L	PCT	W		L	PCT
Boston University	13	–	3	.813	20	–	11	.645
Vermont †	11	–	5	.688	21	–	12	.636
Hartford	10	–	6	.625	16	–	13	.552
Binghamton	9	–	7	.563	14	–	13	.519
Maine	8	–	8	.500	14	–	16	.467
Northeastern	8	–	8	.500	16	–	15	.516
Stony Brook	7	–	9	.438	13	–	15	.464
Albany	3	–	13	.188	7	–	21	.250
New Hampshire	3	–	13	.188	5	–	23	.179
† 2003 America East tournament winner

The 2003 America East men's basketball tournament was hosted by the Boston University Terriers at Walter Brown Arena. The final was held at Case Gym on the campus of Boston University. Vermont gained its first ever America East Championship and an automatic berth to the NCAA tournament with its win over Boston University. Vermont was given the 16th seed in the West Regional of the NCAA Tournament and lost in the first round to Arizona 80–51. Boston University gained a bid to the NIT and lost in the first round to St. John's 73–57.

== Bracket and Results ==
Quarterfinals
1	Boston University	75
8	New Hampshire	61
4	Maine	68
5	Northeastern	71
3	Hartford	59
6	Stony Brook	47
2	Vermont	81
7	Albany	62

Semifinals
1	Boston University	71
5	Northeastern	61
3	Hartford	51
2	Vermont	67

Finals
1	Boston University	55
2	Vermont	56

== See also ==
- America East Conference
