= 2001–02 Princeton Tigers men's basketball team =

American college basketball season

2001–02 Princeton Tigers men's basketball

Ivy League Tri-Champion

One-game Ivy League playoff, Lost 2002 National Invitation Tournament, First Round
- Conference: Ivy League
- Record: 16–12 (11–4, 1st-t Ivy)
- Head coach: John Thompson III (2nd season)
- Assistant coach: Mike Brennan
- Captains: Michael S. Bechtold; Ahmed El-Nokali
- Home arena: Jadwin Gymnasium

2001–02 Ivy League men's basketball standings
	Conf.				Overall
Team	W		L	PCT	W		L	PCT
Penn	11	–	3	.786	25	–	7	.781
Yale	11	–	3	.786	21	–	11	.656
Princeton	11	–	3	.786	16	–	12	.571
Brown	8	–	6	.571	17	–	10	.630
Harvard	7	–	7	.500	14	–	12	.538
Columbia	4	–	10	.286	11	–	17	.393
Dartmouth	2	–	12	.143	9	–	18	.333
Cornell	2	–	12	.143	5	–	22	.185
Rankings from AP Poll

The 2001–02 Princeton Tigers men's basketball team represented the Princeton University in intercollegiate college basketball during the 2001–02 NCAA Division I men's basketball season. The head coach was John Thompson III and the team co-captains were Michael S. Bechtold and Ahmed El-Nokali. The team played its home games in the Jadwin Gymnasium on the University campus in Princeton, New Jersey, and was co-champion of the Ivy League. The team earned an invitation to the 40-team 2000 National Invitation Tournament. The team was making its seventh consecutive postseason appearance.

Using the Princeton offense, the team posted a 16–12 overall record and an 11–4 conference record. The team was led by All-Ivy League second team selections Bechtold and El-Nokali. The team earned the 52nd consecutive home victory over Brown on February 23 to establish a National Collegiate Athletic Association record for consecutive home victories over a single opponent. The North Carolina Tar Heels men's basketball team eclipsed that record with a streak of 59 over Clemson which ended in 2020 at Chapel Hill. The Tigers had a chance to win the Ivy League championship outright by defeating Penn in the regular season finale on March 5, but they lost 64–48, resulting in a three-way tie. By virtue of its superior record head-to-head Penn had a bye in the first round of the three-way playoff. The Tigers played Yale in a one-game playoff with the winner to face Penn in a one-game championship. Princeton lost 76–60 on March 7 at The Palestra in Philadelphia, Pennsylvania. In the National Invitation Tournament the team lost its first round contest against the Louisville Cardinals at Freedom Hall in Louisville, Kentucky on March 12 by a 66–65 score. The team lost on a jump shot with 5.3 seconds remaining.

== Schedule and results ==
The team posted a 16–12 (11-4 Ivy League) record.

Date time, TV	Rank^{#}	Opponent^{#}	Result	Record	Site city, state
Regular season
Nov 15, 2001*		at California	L 58–70	0–1	Haas Pavilion; Berkeley, California
Nov 16, 2001*		vs. No. 10 Saint Joseph's	L 63–74	0–2	Haas Pavilion; Berkeley, California
Nov 24, 2001*		at Florida International	L 44–49	0–3	Golden Panther Arena; Miami, Florida
Nov 28, 2001*		Rider	W 69–57	1–3	Jadwin Gymnasium; Princeton, New Jersey
Dec 2, 2001*		vs. No. 5 Maryland	L 53–61	1–4	Verizon Center; Washington, D.C.
Dec 3, 2001*		vs. George Washington	L 57–60	1–5	Verizon Center; Washington, D.C.
Dec 8, 2001*		Monmouth	W 76–70	2–5	Jadwin Gymnasium; Princeton, New Jersey
Dec 12, 2001*		No. 4 Kansas	L 62–78	2–6	Jadwin Gymnasium; Princeton, New Jersey
Dec 21, 2001*		Lafayette	W 67–61	3–6	Jadwin Gymnasium; Princeton, New Jersey
Dec 29, 2001*		at Rutgers	L 62–70	3–7	Louis Brown Athletic Center; Piscataway, New Jersey
Jan 5, 2002*		Holy Cross	W 52–50	4–7	Jadwin Gymnasium; Princeton, New Jersey
Jan 11, 2002*		at Harvard	W 50–48	5–7	Lavietes Pavilion; Cambridge, Massachusetts
Jan 12, 2002*		at Dartmouth	W 57–46	6–7	Leede Arena; Hanover, New Hampshire
Jan 28, 2002*		McDaniel	W 78–24	7–7	Jadwin Gymnasium; Princeton, New Jersey
Feb 1, 2002		Columbia	W 49–41	8–7 (1–0)	Jadwin Gymnasium; Princeton, New Jersey
Feb 2, 2002		Cornell	W 60–38	9–7 (2–0)	Jadwin Gymnasium; Princeton, New Jersey
Feb 8, 2002		at Brown	W 70–56	10–7 (3–0)	Pizzitola Sports Center; Providence, Rhode Island
Feb 9, 2002		at Yale	L 50–60	10–8 (3–1)	John J. Lee Amphitheater; New Haven, Connecticut
Feb 12, 2002		Penn	L 38–62	10–9 (3–2)	Jadwin Gymnasium; Princeton, New Jersey
Feb 15, 2002		Dartmouth	W 79–68	11–9 (4–2)	Jadwin Gymnasium; Princeton, New Jersey
Feb 16, 2002		Harvard	W 70–59	12–9 (5–2)	Jadwin Gymnasium; Princeton, New Jersey
Feb 22, 2002		Yale	W 59–46	13–9 (6–2)	Jadwin Gymnasium; Princeton, New Jersey
Feb 23, 2002		Brown	W 73–47	14–9 (7–2)	Jadwin Gymnasium; Princeton, New Jersey
Mar 1, 2002		at Cornell	W 61–57	15–9 (8–2)	Newman Arena; Ithaca, New York
Mar 2, 2002		at Columbia	W 49–48	16–9 (9–2)	Levien Gymnasium; New York, New York
Mar 5, 2002		at Penn	L 48–64	16–10 (9–3)	The Palestra; Philadelphia, Pennsylvania
Mar 7, 2002		at Yale; Ivy League Play-off	L 60–76	16–11	John J. Lee Amphitheater; New Haven, Connecticut
National Invitation Tournament
Mar 12, 2002*		at Louisville; First round	L 65–66	16–12	Freedom Hall; Louisville, Kentucky
*Non-conference game. ^{#}Rankings from AP Poll. (#) Tournament seedings in parentheses.
