= Ed Wachter =

American basketball player and coach

Edward A. "Ed" Wachter
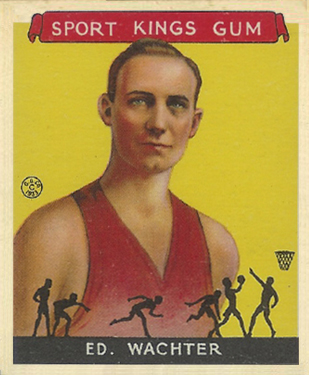

Biographical details
- Born: June 30, 1883
- Died: March 12, 1966 (aged 82)

Playing career
- 1902–1903: Maynard New England Basketball League
- 1902–1904: Ware Wonders Massachusetts Central Basketball League
- 1903–1904: Haverhill New England Basketball Association
- 1904–1905: Lowell–Haverhill New England Basketball Association
- 1904–1905: Schenectady Company E team Independent
- 1904–1905: Troy Columbias A.C. Independent
- 1905–1906: Schenectady Company E team Independent
- 1905–1906: Brattleboro(VT) Independents Independent
- 1905–1906: Troy All-Americans Independent
- 1906–1907: Winsted (CT) Independent
- 1906–1909: Gloversville Co. G Independent
- 1908–1909: McKeesport Tubers Central Basketball League
- 1909–1910: Gloversville Co. G Independent
- 1909–1911: Troy Trojans Hudson River League
- 1911–1915: Troy Trojans New York State League
- 1914–1915: Troy Trojans Independent
- 1915–1916: Utica Utes New York State League
- 1915–1916: Kingston Pathfinders Interstate Basketball League
- 1916–1917: Hudson Company F New York State League
- 1918–1920: Windsor (VT) Namcos Independent
- 1919–1920: Springfield Gunners Inter-State League
- 1920–1921: Albany Senators New York State League
- Position: Center

Coaching career (HC unless noted)
- 1915–1916: New York State Normal College at Albany
- 1915: Rensselaer Polytechnic Institute
- 1916–1920: Williams College
- 1920–1933: Harvard College
- 1935–1938: Lafayette College, Advisory Coach

Head coaching record
- Overall: Harvard College 121–81

Accomplishments and honors

Championships
- Schenectady Company E team National AAU Basketball title 1905; Troy Trojans Hudson River Basketball League championship 1910; Troy Trojans Hudson River Basketball League championship 1912; Troy Trojans New York State League championship 1912; Troy Trojans New York State League championship 1915

Awards
- All-League center, Western Pennsylvania Basketball League 1900–1902; All-League center, New England Basketball League 1902–1904; All-time All-American basketball center 1928
- Basketball Hall of Fame; Inducted in 1961

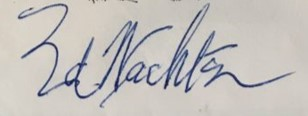
Autograph of Ed Wachter

Edward A. Wachter Jr (June 30, 1883 – March 12, 1966) was a professional basketball player and college coach.

== Early life ==
Wachter was born and raised in Troy, New York, the third of seven children to Theresa and Edward A. F. Wachter. His brothers, Lew, Chuck, Joe, and Vic were also professional basketball players. Wachter did not attend high school or college and never married.

== Professional basketball ==
Wachter began playing professional basketball in 1899. He's suggested to be the first ever professional basketball player to have his player rights sold off, with him going from the Ware Wonders to nearby Haverhill for the price of $100 back in 1903. Wachter played for several professional teams in his 23-year 1,800 game career including the innovative New York based Troy Trojans with whom he won four league championships. Wachter was a dominant center and leading scorer for the Hudson River Valley and New York State Leagues from 1910 to 1915. Wachter did not play 1918–1919 following enlistment in the US Army and training in Fremont, California during WWI.

== Head coaching career ==
Wachter was a college Men's Basketball coach for 35 years beginning when he played with the Utica Utes in 1915. Wachter was hired by Williams College as head Men's basketball coach in 1916. Wachter was head coach of Harvard Men's Basketball from 1920 to 1933 compiling a record of 121–81 (0.599). While at Harvard, Wachter also served as the Harvard Men's sculling and crew coach.

== Basketball innovation ==
With his brother Lew Wachter as well as Jack Inglis, Bill Hardman and Jimmy Williamson, Wachter was instrumental in pioneering offensive strategies such as the bounce pass, screens, 5 man offense and long passing. The Wachter brothers introduced the rule that free throws are taken by the player fouled rather than a designated foul shot player. While at Harvard, Wachter authored "How to Play Basket Ball" in 1926. Wachter also wrote about how the game of basketball could be improved through uniform regulations, rule interpretations and acquiring fundamental skills. In 1927 Wachter voiced strong opposition to the existing one bounce dribble rule. In 1958, Wachter designed an experimental six game basketball tournament at Union College in Schenectady, New York. Four teams from Union College, Hamilton College, Siena College and Rensselaer Polytechnic Institute competed with a rim raised to 10 foot 5 inches and 20 inches from the backboard. Wachter noted that the changes to the rim “minimized the inordinate advantage the tall player now enjoys”.

== Life after coaching ==
Wachter returned to Troy following coaching at Harvard College. Upon his return, he was appointed by the Troy School District as director of physical education. Wachter served as City Assessor of Troy, New York from 1912 to 1920. By 1936 he had become the Commissioner of Recreation for the city of Troy. Wachter retired from his Commissioner duties in 1958 after 22 years of service. He was elected to the Basketball Hall of Fame as a player in 1961.
