= Francis Boggs Snavely =

American football and basketball coach

Biographical details
- Born: April 19, 1897; North Platte, Nebraska, U.S.
- Died: October 29, 1979 (aged 82); Hillsborough County, Florida, U.S.

Coaching career (HC unless noted)

Football
- 1922–1924: Albany

Basketball
- 1920–1924: Albany

Head coaching record
- Overall: 1–12–3 (football); 7–31 (basketball)

Francis Boggs Snavely (April 19, 1897 – October 29, 1979) was an American football and basketball coach. He served as the head football coach at the New York State College for Teachers at Albany—now known as University at Albany, SUNY—from 1922 to 1924, compiling a 1–12–3 record. Snavely was also the school's head basketball coach from 1920 to 1924, tallying a mark of 7–31.

== Head coaching record ==
=== Football ===
Year	Team	Overall	Conference	Standing	Bowl/playoffs
Albany Great Danes (Independent) (1922–1924)
1922	Albany	0–3–2			
1923	Albany	1–5			
1924	Albany	0–4–1			
Albany:		1–12–3			
Total:		1–12–3			
