= Chaz Carr =

Jamaican basketball player (born 1982)

Personal information
- Born: August 30, 1982 (age 44) Manchester, Connecticut, U.S.
- Listed height: 6 ft 0 in (1.83 m)

Career information
- High school: Manchester (Manchester, Connecticut)
- College: Boston University (2001–2005)
- NBA draft: 2005: undrafted
- Playing career: 2005–2009
- Position: Point guard

Career history
- 2005–2006: Unia Tarnów
- 2006: Geoplin Slovan
- 2007: Polonia Warszawa
- 2007: Kapfenberg Bulls
- 2007–2008: Bremen Roosters
- 2008: Íþróttafélag Reykjavíkur
- 2009: UJAP Quimper 29
- 2009: Guaiqueríes de Margarita
Medals
Men’s Basketball
Representing Jamaica
FIBA CBC Championship
Gold medal – first place	2006 Kingston	Team
Gold medal – first place	2009 Tortola	Team

Chaz Carr (born August 30, 1982) is a former Jamaican professional basketball player. He is 1.83 m (6 ft 0 in) tall weighs 182 pounds, and plays point guard. His last professional team was Guaiqueríes de Margarita in Venezuela's first division Liga Profesional de Baloncesto. In 2006, Carr appeared in the Adriatic League with Geoplin Slovan.

== High school career ==
Carr scored 1.273 points during his career at Manchester high school and left the school as its all-time leading scorer. He averaged 21 points per game as a junior and 22 points per game as a senior. In July 2017 he was named to the Manchester Sports Hall of Fame.

== College career ==
Carr graduated from Boston University in 2005, majoring in urban studies. He became the university's eighth all-time leader in scoring (1,406 points), fifth in three-pointers made (177) and 10th in field goals made (470).

== Professional career ==
Besides playing professional basketball in Venezuela, Carr has played in Poland (Unia Tarnów, Polonia Warbud Warszawa), the Dominican Republic (Águilas Cibaeñas), Slovenia (KD Slovan), Austria (Kapfenberg Bulls), Germany (Bremen Roosters) and France (Union Jeanne d'Arc Phalange Quimper).

In August 2008, Carr signed with ÍR of the Úrvalsdeild karla. Due to the Icelandic financial crisis, ÍR released Carr from his contract in October 2008.

== Jamaica national team ==
Carr has played for the Jamaica national basketball team on many occasions. His most noteworthy performance was at the FIBA CBC Championship 2006 where he helped Jamaica win the tournament by averaging 14.6 points, 2.6 rebounds and 3.0 assists per game.
