= 2001–02 Cincinnati Bearcats men's basketball team =

American college basketball season

2001–02 Cincinnati Bearcats men's basketball

Conference USA regular season champions Conference USA tournament champions

NCAA tournament, second round
- Conference: Conference USA

Ranking
- Coaches: No. 8
- AP: No. 5
- Record: 31–4 (14–2 C-USA)
- Head coach: Bob Huggins (13th season)
- Assistant coaches: Mick Cronin (6th season); Andy Kennedy (1st season)
- Home arena: Myrl Shoemaker Center

2001–02 Conference USA men's basketball standings
	Conf.				Overall
Team	W		L	PCT	W		L	PCT
American
No. 5 Cincinnati †	14	–	2	.875	31	–	4	.886
No. 12 Marquette	13	–	3	.813	26	–	7	.788
Charlotte	11	–	5	.688	18	–	12	.600
Saint Louis	9	–	7	.563	15	–	16	.484
Louisville	8	–	8	.500	19	–	13	.594
East Carolina	5	–	11	.313	12	–	18	.400
DePaul	2	–	14	.125	9	–	19	.321
National
Memphis	12	–	4	.750	27	–	9	.750
Houston	9	–	7	.563	18	–	15	.545
South Florida	8	–	8	.500	19	–	13	.594
TCU	6	–	10	.375	16	–	15	.516
UAB	6	–	10	.375	13	–	17	.433
Tulane	5	–	11	.313	14	–	15	.483
Southern Miss	4	–	12	.250	10	–	17	.370
† 2002 Conference USA Tournament winner Rankings from AP Poll

The 2001–02 Cincinnati Bearcats men's basketball team represented University of Cincinnati as a member of Conference USA during the 2001–02 NCAA Division I men's basketball season. The head coach was Bob Huggins, serving in his 13th year at the school. The team won regular season and Conference USA tournament titles to earn an automatic bid to the NCAA tournament as No. 1 seed in the West region. After an opening round victory over Boston University, Cincinnati was upset in the second round by UCLA, 105–101 in double overtime. The Bearcats finished with a 31–4 record (14–2 C-USA).

== Roster ==
2001–02 Cincinnati Bearcats men's basketball team
Players
Coaches

Pos.	#	Name	Height	Weight	Year	Hometown
F	1	Jamaal Davis	6 ft 9 in (2.06 m)	235 lb (107 kg)	Sr	Merrillville, Indiana
G	2	Field Williams	6 ft 4 in (1.93 m)	235 lb (107 kg)	So	Houston, Texas
G	3	John Meeker (W)	6 ft 1 in (1.85 m)	175 lb (79 kg)	So	Troy, Ohio
G	10	Jamaal Lucas	6 ft 2 in (1.88 m)	195 lb (88 kg)	So	Corpus Christi, Texas
G	13	Leonard Stokes	6 ft 6 in (1.98 m)	200 lb (91 kg)	Jr	Buffalo, New York
G	20	Taron Barker	6 ft 1 in (1.85 m)	190 lb (86 kg)	Jr	Racine, Wisconsin
G	22	Steve Logan	5 ft 10 in (1.78 m)	195 lb (88 kg)	Sr	Cleveland, Ohio
F	23	Immanuel McElroy	6 ft 4 in (1.93 m)	195 lb (88 kg)	Sr	Port Arthur, Texas
F	24	Rod Flowers	6 ft 8 in (2.03 m)	240 lb (109 kg)	So	Huntsville, Alabama
F	43	Jimmy Hubbard	6 ft 6 in (1.98 m)	222 lb (101 kg)	Jr	Belton, Missouri
C	44	B. J. Grove	6 ft 11 in (2.11 m)	280 lb (127 kg)	Jr	Cincinnati, Ohio
C	50	Donald Little	6 ft 11 in (2.11 m)	225 lb (102 kg)	Jr	Augusta, Georgia
F	54	Jason Maxiell	6 ft 7 in (2.01 m)	250 lb (113 kg)	Fr	Chicago, Illinois
F		Rodney Crawford	6 ft 5 in (1.96 m)	220 lb (100 kg)	Sr	Cincinnati, Ohio

Head coach

- Bob Huggins

Assistant coach(es)

- Mick Cronin
- Andy Kennedy

Legend

- (C) Team captain
- (S) Suspended
- (I) Ineligible
- (W) Walk-on
- Injured
- Current redshirt

== Schedule and results ==
Date time, TV	Rank^{#}	Opponent^{#}	Result	Record	Site city, state
Regular Season
November 16, 2001*; ESPN		at No. 18 Oklahoma State	L 62–69	0–1	Gallagher-Iba Arena; Stillwater, Oklahoma
November 20, 2001*		Wright State	W 83–54	1–1	Myrl Shoemaker Center; Cincinnati, Ohio
November 24, 2001*		UNLV	W 74–61	2–1	Myrl Shoemaker Center; Cincinnati, Ohio
November 28, 2001*		Dayton	W 77–55	3–1	Myrl Shoemaker Center; Cincinnati, Ohio
December 1, 2001*		Duquesne	W 74–41	4–1	Myrl Shoemaker Center; Cincinnati, Ohio
December 8, 2001*		Coppin State	W 90–39	5–1	Myrl Shoemaker Center; Cincinnati, Ohio
December 10, 2001*		Toledo	W 68–55	6–1	Myrl Shoemaker Center; Cincinnati, Ohio
December 14, 2001*		at Xavier	W 75–55	7–1	Cintas Center; Cincinnati, Ohio
December 17, 2001*	No. 25	Richmond	W 77–46	8–1	Myrl Shoemaker Center; Cincinnati, Ohio
December 20, 2001*	No. 25	vs. Louisiana–Monroe; Las Vegas Classic	W 102–66	9–1	Valley High School; Winchester, Nevada
December 21, 2001*	No. 25	vs. Mississippi State; Las Vegas Classic	W 90–56	10–1	Valley High School; Winchester, Nevada
December 22, 2001*	No. 25	vs. Purdue; Las Vegas Classic	W 79–62	11–1	Valley High School; Winchester, Nevada
December 29, 2001*; WXIX	No. 17	vs. Akron	W 73–57	12–1	Gund Arena; Cleveland, Ohio
January 5, 2002	No. 13	at East Carolina	W 72–62	13–1 (1–0)	Williams Arena at Minges Coliseum; Greenville, North Carolina
January 8, 2002	No. 12	Charlotte	W 71–58	14–1 (2–0)	Myrl Shoemaker Center; Cincinnati, Ohio
January 12, 2002	No. 10	at Houston	W 83–62	15–1 (3–0)	Hoffheinz Pavilion; Houston, Texas
January 19, 2002; CBS	No. 7	Louisville	W 77–50	16–1 (4–0)	Myrl Shoemaker Center; Cincinnati, Ohio
January 22, 2002; ESPN2	No. 4	at Saint Louis	W 54–50	17–1 (5–0)	Scottrade Center; St. Louis, Missouri
January 26, 2002	No. 4	at South Florida	W 78–68	18–1 (6–0)	USF Sun Dome; Tampa, Florida
January 29, 2002; WXIX	No. 4	East Carolina	W 75–48	19–1 (7–0)	Myrl Shoemaker Center; Cincinnati, Ohio
February 2, 2002; ESPN Plus	No. 6	at No. 18 Marquette	L 60–74	19–2 (7–1)	Bradley Center; Milwaukee, Wisconsin
February 6, 2002; ESPN2	No. 6	at Charlotte	W 85–66	20–2 (8–1)	Halton Arena; Charlotte, North Carolina
February 9, 2002; ABC	No. 4	at No. 19 Wake Forest	W 103–94	21–2	Lawrence Joel Veterans Memorial Coliseum; Winston-Salem, North Carolina
February 12, 2002	No. 5	Saint Louis	W 67–53	22–2 (9–1)	Myrl Shoemaker Center; Cincinnati, Ohio
February 15, 2002	No. 5	Southern Miss	W 89–37	23–2 (10–1)	Myrl Shoemaker Center; Cincinnati, Ohio
February 19, 2002	No. 4	at DePaul	W 79–62	24–2 (11–1)	United Center; Chicago, Illinois
February 22, 2002; ESPN	No. 4	No. 9 Marquette	W 63–62	25–2 (12–1)	Myrl Shoemaker Center; Cincinnati, Ohio
February 27, 2002	No. 4	at Louisville	L 71–74	25–3 (13–2)	Freedom Hall; Louisville, Kentucky
Mar 3, 2002	No. 4	Memphis	W 80–75 ^{OT}	26–3 (14–2)	Myrl Shoemaker Center; Cincinnati, Ohio
Conference USA Tournament
Mar 7, 2002	(1) No. 5	(8) South Florida; Quarterfinals	W 79–57	27–3	Firstar Center; Cincinnati, Ohio
Mar 8, 2002	(1) No. 5	(4) Charlotte; Semifinals	W 71–55	28–3	Firestar Center; Cincinnati, Ohio
Mar 9, 2002	(1) No. 5	(2) No. 13 Marquette; Championship Game	W 77–63	29–3	Firestar Center; Cincinnati, Ohio
NCAA Tournament
Mar 15, 2002	(1 W) No. 5	vs. (16 W) Boston University; First Round	W 90–52	30–3	Mellon Arena; Pittsburgh, Pennsylvania
Mar 17, 2002	(1 W) No. 5	vs. (8 W) UCLA; Second Round	L 101–105 ^{2OT}	30–4	Mellon Arena; Pittsburgh, Pennsylvania
*Non-conference game. ^{#}Rankings from AP Poll. (#) Tournament seedings in parentheses. W=West.

== Rankings ==
Ranking movements Legend: ██ Increase in ranking ██ Decrease in ranking — = Not ranked
	Week																			
Poll	Pre	1	2	3	4	5	6	7	8	9	10	11	12	13	14	15	16	17	18	Final
AP	—	—	—	—	—	—	25	17	13	10	7	4	4	6	5	4	4	5	5	Not released
Coaches	—	—	—	—	—	—	25	20	16	12	8	5	4	5	5	4	4	5	5	8

*AP did not release a Week 1 poll nor post-NCAA Tournament rankings
