= Tom Brennan (basketball, born 1949) =

American sportscaster and coach (born 1949)

Biographical details
- Born: May 2, 1949 (age 77); Phillipsburg, New Jersey, U.S.

Playing career
- 1968–1971: Georgia

Coaching career (HC unless noted)
- 1971–1972: Georgia (asst.)
- 1972–1973: Seton Hall (asst.)
- 1973–1975: Villanova (asst.)
- 1976–1977: FDU-Florham
- 1977–1982: William & Mary (asst.)
- 1982–1986: Yale
- 1986–2005: Vermont

Head coaching record
- Overall: 310–334 (.474)

Accomplishments and honors

Championships
- 2 America East regular season (2002, 2005); 3 America East tournament (2003–2005)

Awards
- 3x America East Coach of the Year (1991, 1998, 2002)

Tom Brennan (born May 2, 1949) is a radio and television sportscaster and former men's basketball head coach at the University of Vermont from 1986 to 2005.

== Coaching career ==
Raised in Phillipsburg, New Jersey, Brennan graduated as the all-time leading scorer at Phillipsburg Catholic High School. Brennan graduated from the University of Georgia in 1971, where, as a senior, he received the men's basketball team leadership award.

He began his coaching after graduating in the fall of 1971 as a graduate assistant at Georgia under Ken Rosemond. Sandwiched around a year as head basketball and baseball coach at Division III Fairleigh Dickinson University in Madison, New Jersey, Brennan was an assistant under college basketball coaches Rollie Massimino at Villanova, Bill Raftery at Seton Hall and Bruce Parkhill at William & Mary. In 1982, he was named head coach at Yale where he crafted a four-year record of 46–58, including back-to-back seasons of 14–12 and 13–13. At Yale, he coached players such as Earl "Butch" Graves and NBA veteran Chris Dudley.

In 19 years at Vermont, Brennan led the Catamounts to four 20+ win seasons, three America East championships and UVM's first three NCAA Tournament appearances, including the school's first NCAA Tournament win over Big East champion Syracuse in 2005. Brennan is one of two coaches in America East history to lead his team to three consecutive conference titles.

Brennan's last four Vermont teams brought unprecedented positive national publicity to the men's basketball program and to the school. During his last season, Vermont became the first and only America East team to sell out every one of its home games at Patrick Gymnasium. During the second half of the 2004–05 season the Catamounts were the subject of five parts of ESPN's critically acclaimed nationally televised series, 'The Season.' UVM's upset also was nominated for an ESPY award in 2005.

Standouts that Brennan coached at Vermont include Eddie Benton, the 1996 winner of the Frances Pomeroy Naismith Award given to the nation's top senior less than 6-feet tall, Matt Johnson, Kevin Roberson, Trevor Gaines, T. J. Sorrentine and Taylor Coppenrath, a finalist in 2005 for both the John Wooden and James Naismith National Player of the Year Awards, the first and only America East player to be on a final ballot for National Player of the Year.

== Broadcast career ==
During his coaching career, Brennan co-hosted a morning radio show in Burlington, Vermont called "Corm and the Coach," with radio personality Steve Cormier, which began on WIZN-FM 106.7 FM in 1992. In 1998, the pair moved to WCVP-FM 101.3 and WCVR-FM 102.1 until July 2008, when Brennan decided to retire from his position as morning radio personality. In November 2009, Brennan and Cormier teamed up again to bring "Corm and the Coach" briefly back on the air on 107.1 WNMR before moving to television on WCAXtra TV and on the internet on NSN.net until 2011. Brennan delivers Saturday Night Live-style sports reports and his thoughts on basketball, politics, entertainment, local news and psychology. The Coach's repertoire also included live, pre-dawn wake-up calls to his players and coaching colleagues. In the 2003 and 2004 off-seasons, he also was a co-host on several ESPN national radio shows.

After his retirement from coaching in 2005, Brennan joined ESPN working as a college basketball studio analyst as well as doing color commentary across the ESPN family of networks. He worked at ESPN until 2009. In December 2010, Brennan joined Sirius XM Radio as a co-host of College Basketball Today that airs during the college hoops season. Brennan also does radio commentary for college basketball on Westwood One, now known as Dial Global Sports, as well as television work for NBC Sports Network, appearing as a college basketball analyst on NBC SportsTalk.

== Accomplishments ==
- Hired by Sirius XM and Westwood One (Dial Global Sports) Radio in 2009 as a national college basketball radio show host and game analyst
- Hired as a National College Basketball Analyst by ESPN in 2005
- Led team to a defeat of BIG EAST champion Syracuse University in the first round of the 2005 NCAA tournament
- 2005 America East Champions
- 2004 America East Champions
- 2003 America East Champions
- 2002 America East Regular Season Champions
- 1992 America East Coach of the Year
- 1998 America East Coach of the Year
- 2002 America East Coach of the Year
- 1992 NABC District I (New England) Coach of the Year
- 2002 NABC District I (New England) Coach of the Year
- 2005 New Jersey Sportswriters National Coach of the Year
- All-Time Leader in Games Coached At Vermont
- All-Time Leader in Victories At Vermont

== Family ==
Brennan and his wife, Lynn reside on Lake Champlain in Colchester, Vermont. He has two children: Kelly, who graduated from UVM in 1993 and Brian who was a standout guard at Indiana (Pa.) University, which reached the NCAA D-II Elite Eight in 2000. He has four grandchildren; Caleb, Brennan, Ryder, and Jordan.

== Head coaching record ==
Record table
Season	Team	Overall	Conference	Standing	Postseason
Yale Bulldogs (Ivy League) (1982–1986)
1982–83	Yale	12–14	7–7	3rd	
1983–84	Yale	7–19	4–10	8th	
1984–85	Yale	14–12	7–7	4th	
1985–86	Yale	13–13	7–7	4th	
Yale:		46–58	25–31		
Vermont Catamounts (America East Conference) (1986–2005)
1986–87	Vermont	5–23	3–15	T-7th	
1987–88	Vermont	3–24	2–16	10th	
1988–89	Vermont	6–21	4–14	9th	
1989–90	Vermont	13–17	4–8	5th	
1990–91	Vermont	15–13	5–5	T-3rd	
1991–92	Vermont	16–13	7–7	4th	
1992–93	Vermont	10–17	4–10	T-5th	
1993–94	Vermont	12–15	3–11	7th	
1994–95	Vermont	14–13	7–9	T-4th	
1995–96	Vermont	12–15	10–8	6th	
1996–97	Vermont	14–13	7–11	6th	
1997–98	Vermont	16–11	11–7	T-3rd	
1998–99	Vermont	11–16	7–11	6th	
1999–2000	Vermont	16–12	11–7	4th	
2000–01	Vermont	12–17	7–11	T-7th	
2001–02	Vermont	21–8	13–3	T-1st	
2002–03	Vermont	21–12	11–5	2nd	NCAA Division I First Round
2003–04	Vermont	22–9	15–3	2nd	NCAA Division I First Round
2004–05	Vermont	25–7	16–2	1st	NCAA Division I Second Round
Vermont:		264–276	147–163		
Total:		310–334			
National champion Postseason invitational champion Conference regular season champion Conference regular season and conference tournament champion Division regular season champion Division regular season and conference tournament champion Conference tournament champion
