= Jesse Agel =

American basketball coach

Current position
- Title: Assistant coach
- Team: Columbia
- Conference: Ivy League

Biographical details
- Born: September 24, 1961 (age 65); New York City, New York, U.S.
- Education: Vermont

Coaching career (HC unless noted)
- 1987–1989: Harwood Union HS
- 1989–2005: Vermont (assistant)
- 2006: Colchester HS
- 2006–2008: Brown (assistant)
- 2008–2012: Brown
- 2013–2016: NJIT (assistant)
- 2016–present: Columbia (assistant)

Head coaching record
- Overall: 39–79

Jesse Agel (born September 24, 1961) is an American college basketball coach and was the head men's basketball coach at Brown University from 2008 to 2012. He is currently an assistant coach at Columbia. Previously, Agel was an assistant at NJIT. He is a native of New York City and a graduate of Stuyvesant High School.

Prior to Brown, Agel had a 17-year stint as an assistant coach at his alma mater, the University of Vermont.

== Head coaching record ==
=== College ===
Record table
Season	Team	Overall	Conference	Standing	Postseason
Brown Bears (Ivy League) (2008–2012)
2008–09	Brown	9–19	3–11	8th	
2009–10	Brown	11–20	5–9	6th	
2010–11	Brown	11–17	4–10	7th	
2011–12	Brown	8–23	2–12	7th	
Brown:		39–79	14–42		
Total:		39–79			
