= Lew Wachter =

American basketball player and coach (1881–1966)

Biographical details
- Born: August 14, 1881; Troy, New York, U.S.
- Died: February 14, 1966 (aged 84); Troy, New York, U.S.

Playing career
- 1898–1899: Troy YMCA
- 1899–1903: Columbia A. C.
- 1903–1906: Co. E.
- 1906–1909: Co. G.
- 1909–1915: Troy
- 1915–1917: Nanticoke

Coaching career (HC unless noted)

Men's basketball
- 1909–1911: RPI
- 1909–1915: Troy
- 1915–1916: Gloversville
- 1916–1917: Nanticoke
- 1918–1924: NAMCO
- 1924–1928: Dartmouth

Baseball
- 1915–1916: Troy Trojans

Head coaching record
- Overall: 59–26 (.694) (College)

Accomplishments and honors

Championships
- As player 1x AAU world champion (1905); As player-coach 2x Hudson River League champion 2x New York State Basketball League champion As coach 1x Eastern Intercollegiate Basketball League champion (1927)

Louis William Wachter (August 14, 1881 – February 14, 1966) was an American basketball player and coach who played, coached, and managed early professional teams in New York state. From 1924 to 1928, he was the head coach at Dartmouth College.

== Early life ==
Wachter was born on August 14, 1881 in Troy, New York. His brothers, Ed, Chuck, Joe, and Vic were also basketball players. Wachter graduated from Troy High School, Albany Business College, and Rensselaer Polytechnic Institute.

== Playing ==
Wachter's basketball career began in 1898 with the Troy YMCA. From 1899 to 1903, he was a member of the Columbia Athletic Club. From 1903 to 1906, he was a member of the Co. E. team from Schenectady, New York. The team won the Amateur Athletic Union world championship in 1905. Wachter was the team manager in 1906. From 1906 to 1909, he played for the Co. G. team from Gloversville, New York. The team won their league title all three years Wachter was on the team. He doubled as team manager in 1907 and 1908. In 1909, he founded a professional team in his hometown of Troy. He led the club to four titles (two in the Hudson River League and two in the New York State Basketball League) as player-manager. When the NYSL folded during the 1914–15 season, Wachter took the club on a barnstorming tour that saw them win 38 straight games. He ended his playing career in 1917 as the player-manager of the Nanticoke club in the Pennsylvania State League.

== Coaching ==
Wachter and his brother Ed advocated for many playing techniques that are commonplace today, including the bounce pass, screens and having all five players on offense. They also pushed to have the player who was fouled shoot the free throw rather than a single designated player.

From 1909 to 1911, Wachter coached Rensselaer Polytechnic Institute's men's basketball team. In 1915 and 1916, he managed the Troy Trojans baseball team, which he co-owned with Johnny Evers. From 1918 to 1924, he was the coach and manager of NAMCO team in Windsor, Vermont. From 1924 to 1928, he was the head coach of the Dartmouth men's basketball team. He led the team its first-ever Eastern Intercollegiate Basketball League title in 1927. His overall record at school was 59–26.

== Later life ==
Wachter spent his later years in Troy. He died on February 14, 1966 after a long illness.
