= Bremen Roosters =

SG Oslebshausen
- Sport: Basketball
- Founded: 2002
- Team history: Bremen Roosters (2002-2009); SG Oslebshausen (2009-2010)
- Colors: White and blue

SG Oslebshausen was a basketball club from Bremen, Germany. The club men's senior team was playing in the German ‘’Regionalliga’’ (4th Division) until 2010. Then the team withdrew from the league because of financial problems. Between 2002 and 2009 the club became well known for the basketball operations of the Bremen Roosters which played in Germany's second division Pro A but is now defunct.

== 2009-2010 roster ==
(United States)	Terryl Woolery	Forward
(Germany) (Senegal)	Omar Ba	Guard/forward
(Germany) (Denmark)	Thomas Hakanowitz	Forward
(Germany)	Igor Barg	Point guard
(Germany)	Maximilian Wagner	Forward
(Germany)	Björn Fenneberg	Guard
(Germany)	Jonas Liermann	Forward
(Germany)	Paul Heitzhausen	Forward
(Germany)	Nick Hein	Forward
(Germany)	Paul Kowalski	Center

Roster updated 03-26-2010

== Notable former players ==
Germany

- Andre Bade

Jamaica

- Chaz Carr

Yemen

- Taha Alassari
