= Albany Great Danes men's basketball =

2026–27 Albany Great Danes men's basketball team
- University: University at Albany, State University of New York
- First season: 1909–10; 117 years ago
- Head coach: Dwayne Killings (5th season)
- Location: Albany, New York
- Arena: Broadview Center (capacity: 4,553)
- Conference: America East
- Nickname: Great Danes
- Colors: Purple and gold
- All-time record: 1,379–1,082 (.560)

NCAA Division I tournament appearances
- 2006, 2007, 2013, 2014, 2015

NCAA Division II tournament appearances
- 1969

NCAA Division III tournament Elite Eight
- 1994
Other NCAA Division III tournament results
Sweet Sixteen	1990, 1994
Appearances	1975, 1977, 1979, 1980, 1981, 1985, 1990, 1992, 1994, 1995

Conference tournament champions
- 2006, 2007, 2013, 2014, 2015

Conference regular-season champions
- 2006, 2015

Uniforms
Home	Away

The Albany Great Danes men's basketball team is the basketball team that represent the University at Albany, State University of New York in Albany, New York. The school's team currently competes in the America East Conference and plays its home games at Broadview Center. The team played in the NCAA Division I men's basketball tournament in 2006, 2007, 2013, 2014, and 2015. They also made the CIT in 2016 and 2017, and are currently coached by Dwayne Killings.

== Team history ==
=== The early years: "Doc" Sauers ===
Richard “Doc” Sauers served as Great Danes men's basketball coach from 1955 to 1997, with a short break in the 1987–88 season. He led the program to eleven NCAA College Division/Division III and four NAIA post-season tournament appearances in his tenure. Sauers finished his career with a 702–330 record in 41 seasons. Sauers achieved the 700-win mark on February 8, 1997, in an 89–71 victory over the University of Bridgeport. He would retire one month later and be inducted into the school's Hall of Fame in 2004. A banner is flown in the rafters of the Broadview Center honoring Sauers accomplishment of 702 wins.

=== The 2005–06 season: "Why not us?" ===
The process to become a Division I program was slow. From the 1999–2000 season, the first year in Division I, to the end of the 2004–05 season, UAlbany recorded a 48–118 record. The team finished with over 10 victories in only two seasons. However, in the 2005–06 campaign, the Great Danes compiled a 21–11 season. In that season, the Great Danes would take on both the Florida Gators and UCLA Bruins, who would play each other for the national championship. On March 11, 2006, the men's basketball team won the America East conference tournament, earning the school (and the SUNY system) its first ever berth to the NCAA tournament, defeating the University of Vermont 80–67 in a sold out RACC. The Great Danes were seeded #16 in the Washington, D.C., region and were matched up against top-seeded UConn. Despite the #16 seed being 0–87 before UAlbany took the floor, Head Coach Will Brown believed that his team had a chance to beat UConn in the tournament. With that, the team took the motto, "Why Not Us?".

On March 17, 2006, the Danes nearly became the first #16 seed to defeat a #1 seed in the Division I tournament. The Danes, down only 1 at the half, went on a 13–0 run early in the second half to take a double-digit lead over the Huskies. With the game televised on CBS, the Danes led 50–38 with just over 11 minutes left in the game. However, a 34–9 run by the Huskies' and stifling defense stopped the Danes' offense, the Huskies averted the upset, winning 72–59. The game against UConn gave the program instant notoriety.

=== The 2006–07 season: "Lucky 13" ===
In the 2006–07 season, the Great Danes faced a much stronger America East conference. The Great Danes would accomplish a 20–9 regular season, but be the #2 seed in the conference tournament. This forced the Great Danes to travel to Vermont, who was the #1 seed for the conference championship, and were previously 0–7. On March 10, 2007, the Danes' won their second consecutive America East title beating Vermont 60–59 in the conference final on a last second steal by Carl Ross and Brent Wilson.

The Great Danes would be seeded 13th in the South Division of the 2007 NCAA tournament. Creating a new motto "Lucky 13" which was worn on T-shirts sold on campus. On March 16, 2007, two busses carrying approximately 80 students would drive a total of 11 hours to see their Danes at the Nationwide Arena in Columbus, Ohio, to see the #13 seed lose to the #4 seed Virginia Cavaliers 84–57 in the first round of the Tournament.

Prior to the conclusion of the season, the program would retire the number 31 of player Jamar Wilson. Wilson finished his career as the school's all-time scorer with 2,164 points, plus ranked second in assists with 488. Wilson also became the first player in school history to score 500 points or more in three different seasons. He would also win two America East Player of the Year Awards, something only three other people in conference history had achieved. No athlete in the program's history has had their number retired prior.

=== The 2008–09 season: UAlbany hosts the tourney ===
With only two of their remaining pieces from the "Why Not Us?" team still intact, Brian Connelly and Jimmie Covington, the Danes would look to rebuild with eight newcomers to the team. They would start the season 0–2 after matchups with Big East opponents Villanova and DePaul in "homecoming" games for their seniors. A 5–0 run after the slow start would put the Danes' in prime position to upset their crosstown rival Siena Saints, who had just endured 3 loses over 4 days at the 2008 Old Spice Classic in Orlando, Florida. However the Danes' would fall short by seven points. The Great Danes would win three of their next four games including a game postponed for snow and difficult travel conditions in Fairfield, Connecticut, against Sacred Heart before closing out the calendar year against the defending national champions Kansas Jayhawks. The purple-and-gold squad would fall behind early and not show any signs of life against the Jayhawks, in a 79–43 loss on nationally televised ESPNU.

Entering conference play the Danes had an 8–5 record before falling to 8–6 and 0–1 in the conference with a loss to Hartford Hawks, after heading home the team would rebound with a last second win against conference favorite Boston U. Terriers 62–61 and also giving coach Will Brown his 100th career victory as head coach of the team. Following Brown's 100th win, the team would win for the third consecutive time in Burlington, Vermont, beating the heavily favored Catamounts by a score of 82–77, the team would then return home to beat I-88 rival Binghamton by a score of 72–66. However the team would struggle down the remainder of the conference schedule, winning only 3 of their final 12 conference games.

With the America East Conference tournament at SEFCU Arena for the first time in Albany's 9-year history as a member of the conference; the Great Danes would head into the tournament as the #7 seed with a 6–10 conference record, and face the #2 seeded Catamounts yet again. Prior to the 2009 season the #7 seed had gone 0–23 in games against the #2 overall seed, however Albany would prevail and upset the higher seeded Catamounts 56–52, but would lose to UMBC in the semi-finals. Other tournament games included the #8–9 matchup in which the Hartford Hawks would beat Maine on Friday, March 6 to advance to a matchup against top-seeded Binghamton. The Bearcats would then beat the Hawks, and other semi-final games included UMBC upsetting the 3rd seeded Boston U. Terriers, and the UNH Wildcats would beat Stony Brook in the #4–5 matchup. The other Sunday semi-final matchup had #1 Binghamton beat #4 New Hampshire. Binghamton hosted UMBC on Saturday March 14 on ESPN2 for the 2009 Championship.

=== The 2012–13 and 2013–14 seasons: The Year of the Upsets ===
In 2012–13, the Great Danes would go 21–10 in the regular season. The season was highlighted by games against Top 10 ranked Ohio State and a 63–62 victory against the University of Washington in Seattle on November 13, 2012. Despite 21 wins, UAlbany had lost twice to regular season champions Stony Brook, regular season runner-up Vermont and third place Boston University, giving many fans limited faith in making a run for a conference title. However, the Great Danes would knock off Maine 50–49 and upset Stony Brook 61–59 in the 2013 Conference tournament, played at SEFCU Arena. On March 16, 2013, the Great Danes traveled to Vermont for a chance to win the AE Championship. Despite a 10–0 run by Vermont to start the game and being out-rebounded 34–20, the Great Danes pulled off the upset 53–49 to win the AE Championship and receive the conference automatic qualifier to the NCAA Tournament. It was the third straight victory for the Danes in the AE Championship game and the third time beating Vermont for the title. UAlbany became the first #4 seed to win the conference tournament.

=== The Three-Peat and "The Shot" ===
The 2013–14 season had many ups and downs for the Great Danes. The Great Danes played near .500 basketball for the entire season. They would finish 15–14 on the regular season, 9–7 in conference play, ranked #4 going into the conference tournament. With the tournament being hosted on their home court, UAlbany cruised to a first round win over UMBC. In the semifinals, the Great Danes pulled off the upset vs. #1 seed Vermont 67–58. The Great Danes were then forced to travel to Stony Brook for the Championship Game. On March 15, 2014, the Great Danes would defeat Stony Brook 69–60 to win their second straight AE Title and fourth title in nine years. On March 18, Albany won its first ever NCAA tournament victory, 71–64 over Mount St. Mary's in the First Four Round of the tournament. They would go on to lose to Florida in the 2nd Round

Despite winning back-to-back championships, the Great Danes were selected fourth in preseason polls. The Great Danes opened the season 2–6, but finished the regular season 19–2 (15–1 in America East play). The Great Danes went into the America East tournament as the #1 seed. UAlbany defeated Maine and squeaked by New Hampshire. They played Stony Brook at SEFCU Arena in a rematch of the previous year's championship. Stony Brook was the only conference team to beat the Danes during the regular season.

On March 14, 2015, in front of a sold out SEFCU Arena, the Great Danes defeated Stony Brook 51–50 to win their third straight conference title. The Great Danes won the game on a three-point shot by Peter Hooley with 1.6 seconds to go. "The Shot" gained national attention because of Hooley. Hooley, a native of Australia, left the team for nearly an entire month to be with his mother, who had died from colon cancer. Hooley stated after the game, "When you've got angels watching, you can do anything." Because of the game winning shot, Hooley and the Great Danes received national attention, as Hooley appeared on Sports Center and CBS' Road to March Madness Show. On March 20, 2015, The Great Danes fell to Oklahoma 69–60 in the second round of the 2015 NCAA basketball tournament.

=== Additional history ===
While not making the NCAA Tournament from the 2006–07 season to the 2012–13 season, the Great Danes did participate in a postseason tournaments. In 2011–12, UAlbany made the CIT Tournament, but lost to Manhattan in the first round. In 2016, they participated in the CBI Tournament, losing to Ohio in the first round in overtime.

In 2009, the University at Albany played host to its first America East Men's Basketball Championship at the 4,538-seat SEFCU Arena on campus. The America East brought the conference tournament back to SEFCU for the 2013 and 2014 Conference Championship.

== Coaches ==
=== Current coaching staff ===
- Head coach – Dwayne Killings
- Assistant coach – Jim Whitesell
- Assistant coach – Dan Madhavapallil
- Assistant coach – Willie Jenkins
- Assistant coach – Elijah Burns
- Director of Basketball Operations - Will Ferris

=== All-time head coaches ===
Years	Coach	Win	Loss	Win %	Conference Titles	NCAA Tournament Appearances	NCAA Titles
1913–1916	Arch B. Swaim	26	10	.722	-	-	-
1916–1917	Edward Wachter	3	11	.214	-	-	-
1917–1919	Arthur Maroney	10	11	.476	-	-	-
1919–1920	Wilfred Clarke	4	8	.333	-	-	-
1920–1924	Francis Snavely	7	31	.184	-	-	-
1924–1935	Rutherford Baker	70	37	.654	-	-	-
1935–1936	Irving Goewey	7	9	.438	-	-	-
1936–1943	G. Elliott Hatfield	31	57	.352	-	-	-
1945–1955	Merlin Hathaway	67	107	.385	-	-	-
1955–1987; 1988–1997	Doc Sauers	702	330	.680	2 (ECAC)	24 (10 Division III / 9 ECAC / 4 NAIA /1 College Division)	-
1987–1988	Barry Cavanaugh	16	10	.615	-	-	-
1997–2000	Scott Hicks	44	39	.530	-	-	-
2000–2001	Scott Beeten	7	29	.194	-	-	-
2001–2021	Will Brown	315	285	.525	5 (America East)	5 (5 NCAA tournament)	-
2021–present	Dwayne Killings	62	97	.390	-	-	-

=== Retired numbers ===
Albany Great Danes retired numbers
No.	Player	Pos.	Tenure	No. ret.	Ref.
31	Jamar Wilson	PG	2002–2007	–	

=== Honored ===
No.	Person	Pos.	Tenure	Ref.
702 (Note: The number symbolises the 702 victories that made Sauers be among the top 40 winningest colleges coaches in NCAA history.)	Doc Sauers	Coach	1955–1997	

== All-time records, standings, and statistics ==
=== Coaching records and standings ===
Year	Coach	Regular Season			Conference				Postseason
Year	Coach	Won	Lost	Win %	Won	Lost	Win %	Standing	Postseason
Division III (Independent) (1909–1958)
1909–10		4	4	.500	-	-	–	–	
1910–11		3	3	.500	-	-	–	–	
1911–12		1	4	.200	-	-	–	–	
1912–13	Arch B. Swaim	7	3	.700	-	-	–	–	
1913–14	Arch B. Swaim	10	3	.769	-	-	–	–	
1914–15	Arch B. Swaim	5	1	.833	-	-	–	–	
1915–16	Arch B. Swaim	4	3	.571	-	-	–	–	
1916–17	Edward Wachter	3	11	.214	-	-	–	–	
1917–18	Arthur Maroney	4	8	.333	-	-	–	–	
1918–19	Arthur Maroney	6	3	.667	-	-	–	–	
1919–20	Wilfred Clarke	4	8	.333	-	-	–	–	
1920–21	Francis Snavely	6	6	.500	-	-	–	–	
1921–22	Francis Snavely	0	5	.000	-	-	–	–	
1922–23	Francis Snavely	1	9	.100	-	-	–	–	
1923–24	Francis Snavely	0	11	.000	-	-	–	–	
1924–25	Rutherford Baker	5	5	.500	-	-	–	–	
1925–26	Rutherford Baker	8	5	.615	-	-	–	–	
1926–27	Rutherford Baker	10	1	.909	-	-	–	–	
1927–28	Rutherford Baker	7	2	.778	-	-	–	–	
1928–29	Rutherford Baker	8	2	.800	-	-	–	–	
1929–30	Rutherford Baker	4	6	.400	-	-	–	–	
1930–31	Rutherford Baker	3	7	.300	-	-	–	–	
1931–32	Rutherford Baker	6	2	.750	-	-	–	–	
1932–33	Rutherford Baker	7	3	.700	-	-	–	–	
1933–34	Rutherford Baker	4	3	.571	-	-	–	–	
1934–35	Rutherford Baker	8	1	.889	-	-	–	–	
1935–36	Irving Goewey	7	9	.438	-	-	–	–	
1936–37	G. Elliot Hatfield	6	10	.375	-	-	–	–	
1937–38	G. Elliot Hatfield	9	5	.643	-	-	–	–	
1938–39	G. Elliot Hatfield	6	6	.500	-	-	–	–	
1939–40	G. Elliot Hatfield	4	7	.364	-	-	–	–	
1940–41	G. Elliot Hatfield	2	10	.167	-	-	–	–	
1941–42	G. Elliot Hatfield	3	8	.273	-	-	–	–	
1942–43	G. Elliot Hatfield	1	11	.083	-	-	–	–	
1943–44									
1944–45									
1945–46	Merlin Hathaway	4	5	.444	-	-	–	–	
1946–47	Merlin Hathaway	2	14	.125	-	-	–	–	
1947–48	Merlin Hathaway	6	8	.429	-	-	–	–	
1948–49	Merlin Hathaway	7	14	.333	-	-	–	–	
1949–50	Merlin Hathaway	4	15	.211	-	-	–	–	
1950–51	Merlin Hathaway	6	13	.316	-	-	–	–	
1951–52	Merlin Hathaway	12	6	.667	-	-	–	–	
1952–53	Merlin Hathaway	11	9	.550	-	-	–	–	
1953–54	Merlin Hathaway	13	7	.650	-	-	–	–	
1954–55	Merlin Hathaway	2	16	.111	-	-	–	–	
1955–56	Richard Sauers	11	9	.550	-	-	–	–	
1956–57	Richard Sauers	17	5	.723	-	-	–	–	
1957–58	Richard Sauers	17	5	.723	-	-	–	–	NAIA District 31 Tournament (Loss to Rider 52–42)
Division III (SUNYAC) (1958–1995)
1958–59	Richard Sauers	17	8	.692	-	-	–	–	NAIA District 31 Tournament (Win over Pratt 68–60) (Loss to Fairleigh Dickinson 56–53)
1959–60	Richard Sauers	16	10	.615	-	-	–	–	NAIA District 31 Tournament (Loss to Maryland State 73–55) (Loss to Pratt 61–55)
1960–61	Richard Sauers	22	6	.786	-	-	–	–	NAIA District 31 Tournament (Win over Jersey City 64–63) (Loss to Maryland State 69–53)
1961–62	Richard Sauers	19	6	.760	-	-	–	–	
1962–63	Richard Sauers	14	12	.538	-	-	–	–	
1963–64	Richard Sauers	11	11	.500	-	-	–	–	
1964–65	Richard Sauers	16	6	.727	-	-	–	–	
1965–66	Richard Sauers	13	9	.591	-	-	–	–	
1966–67	Richard Sauers	15	7	.682	-	-	–	–	
1967–68	Richard Sauers	18	4	.818	-	-	–	–	
1968–69	Richard Sauers	18	6	.750	-	-	–	–	NCAA College Division East Regionals (Loss to Wagner 109–64) (Win over Le Moyne 71–70)
1969–70	Richard Sauers	13	9	.591	-	-	–	–	
1970–71	Richard Sauers	17	5	.773	-	-	–	–	
1971–72	Richard Sauers	17	6	.739	-	-	–	–	
1972–73	Richard Sauers	17	8	.680	-	-	–	–	ECAC Upstate New York Tournament (Win over St. Lawrence 69–55) (Loss to Union 69–64)
1973–74	Richard Sauers	17	8	.680	-	-	–	–	ECAC Upstate New York Tournament (Loss to Brockport 81–64) (Win over Geneseo 94–73)
1974–75	Richard Sauers	15	10	.600	-	-	–	–	NCAA Division III East Regionals (Loss to St. Lawrence 82–63) (Loss to Rensselaer 72–55)
1975–76	Richard Sauers	12	11	.521	-	-	–	–	
1976–77	Richard Sauers	19	7	.731	-	-	–	–	NCAA Division III East Regionals (Win over Ithaca 75–58) (Loss to Oneonta 47–46)
1977–78	Richard Sauers	15	9	.625	-	-	–	–	ECAC Upstate New York Tournament (Win over Oneonta 59–49) (Win over Hamilton 101–95 in OT)
1978–79	Richard Sauers	20	7	.741	-	-	–	–	NCAA Diviosion III South Regionals (Loss to Savannah State 82–81 in OT) (Win over Lane 83–82 in OT)
1979–80	Richard Sauers	21	6	.778	-	-	–	–	NCAA Division III East Regionals (Win over St. Lawrence 75–66) (Loss to Potsdam 87–72)
1980–81	Richard Sauers	23	5	.821	-	-	–	–	NCAA Division III East Regionals (Win over St. Lawrence 45–44) (Loss to Potsdam 68–63)
1981–82	Richard Sauers	18	10	.643	-	-	–	–	ECAC Upstate New York Tournament (Win over Oswego 70–66) (Loss to Hamilton 64–54)
1982–83	Richard Sauers	17	10	.630	-	-	–	–	ECAC Upstate New York Tournament (Loss to Rochester 90–76)
1983–84	Richard Sauers	14	11	.560	-	-	–	–	ECAC Upstate New York Tournament (Loss to Binghamton 46–44)
1984–85	Richard Sauers	22	6	.786	-	-	–	–	NCAA Division III East Regionals (Loss to Worcester Polyechnic 58–57) (Win over Westfield State 78–70)
1985–86	Richard Sauers	18	9	.667	-	-	–	–	ECAC Upstate New York Tournament (Win over Utica 98–58) (Loss to Binghamton 62–61)
1986–87	Barry Cavanaugh	21	7	.750	-	-	–	–	ECAC Upstate New York Tournament (Win over Hartwick 72–60) (Win over Plattsburgh 73–72) (Loss to Hamilton 65–62)
1987–88	Richard Sauers	16	10	.615	-	-	–	–	
1988–89	Richard Sauers	20	8	.714	-	-	–	–	ECAC Upstate New York Tournament (Win over Union 74–60) (Win over St. John Fisher 85–75) (Win over Geneseo 83–76)
1989–90	Richard Sauers	20	9	.690	-	-	–	–	NCAA Division III East Regionals (Win over Potsdam 85–75) (Loss to North Adams 69–66) (Loss to Southeastern Massachusetts 92–91)
1990–91	Richard Sauers	14	12	.538	-	-	–	–	
1991–92	Richard Sauers	21	7	.750	-	-	–	–	NCAA Division III East Regionals (Win over New York University 72–66) (Loss to Rochester 75–49)
1992–93	Richard Sauers	15	10	.600	-	-	–	–	
1993–94	Richard Sauers	25	3	.893	-	-	–	–	NCAA Division III East Regionals (Win over St. John Fisher 84–72) (Win over Richard Stockton 60–54) (Loss to New York University 67–65)
1994–95	Richard Sauers	18	8	.692	-	-	–	–	NCAA Division III East Regionals (Win over St. John Fisher 92–84) (Loss to Geneseo 71–70)
Division III (New England Collegiate Conference) (1995–1997)
1995–96	Richard Sauers	12	15	.444	-	-	–	–	New England Collegiate Conference tournament (Loss to Le Moyne 76–73 in OT)
1996–97	Richard Sauers	17	10	.630	-	-	–	–	New England Collegiate Conference tournament (Loss to Massachusetts-Lowell 61–50)
Division II (Independent) (1997–1999)
1997–98	Scott Hicks	19	8	.704	-	-	–	–	ECAC Division II Tournament (Loss to Merrimack 92–82)
1998–99	Scott Hicks	14	14	.500	-	-	–	–	ECAC Division II Tournament (Loss to Merrimack 76–62)
Division I (Independent) (1999–2001)
1999–2000	Scott Hicks	11	17	.393	-	-	–	–	
2000–01	Scott Beeten	6	22	.214	-	-	–	–	
Division I (America East Conference) (2001–present)
2001–02	Scott Beeten Will Brown	8	20	.286	5	11	.313	T–8th	America East Conference tournament (quarter-final Loss to Hartford 65–49)
2002–03	Will Brown	7	21	.250	3	13	.188	T–9th	America East Conference tournament (quarter-final Loss to Vermont 81–62)
2003–04	Will Brown	5	23	.179	3	15	.167	10th	America East Conference tournament (first round Loss New Hampshire 43–38)
2004–05	Will Brown	13	15	.464	9	9	.500	4th	America East Conference tournament (quarter-final loss to Binghamton 76–70)
2005–06	Will Brown	21	11	.656	13	3	.813	1st	America East Conference tournament (quarter-final Win over UMBC 79–65) (semi-final Win over New Hampshire 67–54) (championship Win over Vermont 80–67); NCAA First Round (Loss to UConn 72–59)
2006–07	Will Brown	23	10	.697	13	3	.813	2nd	America East Conference tournament (quarter-final Win over New Hampshire 64–47) (semi-final Win over Boston U. 59–49) (championship Win over Vermont 60–59); NCAA First Round (Loss to Virginia 84–57)
2007–08	Will Brown	15	15	.500	10	6	.625	3rd	America East Conference tournament (quarter-final Loss to Boston U. 68–64 in OT)
2008–09	Will Brown	15	16	.484	6	10	.375	7th	America East Conference tournament (quarter-final Win vs. Vermont 56–52 in OT) (semi-final Loss vs. UMBC 64–58)
2009–10	Will Brown	7	25	.219	2	14	.143	9th	America East Conference tournament (quarter-final Loss to Stony Brook 68–59)
2010–11	Will Brown	16	16	.500	9	7	.563	4th	America East Conference tournament (quarter-final Loss to Stony Brook 67–61)
2011–12	Will Brown	19	15	.559	9	7	.563	4th	America East Conference tournament (quarter-final Win vs. New Hampshire 63–45) (semi-final Loss to Stony Brook 57–55); CollegeInsider.com Postseason Tournament (first round Loss to Manhattan 89–79)
2012–13	Will Brown	24	11	.686	9	7	.563	4th	America East Conference tournament (quarter-final Win vs. Maine 50–49) (semi-final Win vs. Stony Brook 61–59) (championship Win vs. Vermont 53–49); NCAA Round of 64 (Loss to Duke 73–61)
2013–14	Will Brown	19	15	.559	9	7	.563	4th	America East Conference tournament (quarter-final Win vs. UMBC 86–56) (semi-final Win vs. Vermont 67–58) (championship Win vs. Stony Brook 69–60); NCAA Round of 64 (First Four Win vs. Mount St. Mary's 71–64) (second round Loss to Florida 55–67)
2014–15	Will Brown	24	9	.727	15	1	.938	1st	America East Conference tournament (quarter-final Win vs. Maine 83–66) (semi-final Win vs. New Hampshire 60–58) (championship Win vs. Stony Brook 51–50); NCAA Round of 64 (Loss to Oklahoma 69–60)
2015–16	Will Brown	24	9	.727	13	3	.813	2nd	America East Conference tournament (quarter-final loss vs. Hartford 68–59); College Basketball Invitational First round (Loss to Ohio 90–94^{OT})
2016–17	Will Brown	21	14	.600	10	6	.625	4th	America East Conference tournament (quarter-final win vs. Hartford 100–71) (semi-final Win vs. Stony Brook 63–56) (championship loss vs. Vermont 56–53); CollegeInsider.com Postseason Tournament First round (Loss to Saint Peter's 59–55)
2017–18	Will Brown	22	10	.688	10	6	.625	4th	America East Conference tournament (quarter-final loss vs. Stony Brook 69–60)
2018–19	Will Brown	12	20	.375	7	9	.438	6th	America East Conference tournament (quarter-final loss vs. UMBC 62–54)
2019–20	Will Brown	14	18	.438	7	9	.438	7th	America East Conference tournament (quarter-final loss vs. Stony Brook 76–73)
2020–21	Will Brown	7	9	.438	6	6	.500	5th	America East Conference tournament (first round win vs. NJIT 76–66) (quarter-final loss vs. Hartford 88–77)
2021–22	Dwayne Killings	13	18	.419	9	9	.500	5th	America East Conference tournament (quarter-final loss vs. Hartford 61–49)
2022–23	Dwayne Killings	8	23	.258	3	13	.188	9th	Did not qualify for America East Conference tournament
2023–24	Dwayne Killings	13	19	.406	5	11	.313	8th	America East Conference tournament (quarter-final loss vs. Vermont 75–72)
2024–25	Dwayne Killings	17	16	.515	8	8	.500	4th	America East Conference tournament (quarter-final win vs. Binghamton 69–66) (semi-final loss vs. Bryant 91–78)
2025–26	Dwayne Killings	11	21	.344	7	9	.438	5th	America East Conference tournament (quarter-final loss vs. UMass Lowell 81–76)
UAlbany Totals:		1379	1082	.560	200	202	.497		

== Postseason ==
=== NCAA Division I tournament results ===
The Great Danes have appeared in the NCAA Division I tournament five times. Their combined record is 1–5.

Year	Seed	Round	Opponent	Result
2006	#16	First Round	#1 Connecticut	L 59–72
2007	#13	First Round	#4 Virginia	L 57–84
2013	#15	First Round	#2 Duke	L 61–73
2014	#16	First Four; First Round	#16 Mount St. Mary's #1 Florida	W 71–64; L 55–67
2015	#14	First Round	#3 Oklahoma	L 60–69

=== NCAA Division II tournament results ===
The Great Danes have appeared in the NCAA Division II tournament one time. Their record is 1–1.

Year	Round	Opponent	Result
1969	Regional Semi-finals; Regional 3rd Place Game	Wagner; Le Moyne	L 109–64; W 71–70

=== NCAA Division III tournament results ===
The Great Danes have appeared in the NCAA Division III tournament ten times. Their combined record is 9–13.

Year	Round	Opponent	Result
1975	Regional Semifinals; Regional 3rd Place Game	Saint Lawrence; Rensselaer	L 63–82; L 55–72
1977	Regional Semifinals; Regional Finals	Ithaca; Oneonta State	W 75–58; L 46–47
1979	Regional Semifinals; Regional 3rd Place Game	Savannah State; Lane	L 81–82^{OT} W 85–83^{OT}
1980	Regional Semifinals; Regional Finals	Saint Lawrence; Potsdam	W 75–66; L 72–87
1981	Regional Semifinals; Regional Finals	Saint Lawrence; Potsdam	W 45–44; L 68–63^{OT}
1985	Regional Semifinals; Regional 3rd Place Game	Worcester Tech; Westfield State	L 57–58^{OT} L 70–78
1990	Regional Quarterfinals; Regional Semifinals; Regional 3rd Place Game	Potsdam; North Adams State; Southeastern Massachusetts	W 87–75; L 66–69; L 91–92
1992	Regional First Round; Regional Quarterfinals	NYU; Rochester	W 72–66; L 49–75
1994	Regional Quarterfinals; Regional Semifinals; Regional Finals	Saint John Fisher; Richard Stockton; NYU	W 84–72; W 60–54; L 65–67
1995	Regional First Round; Regional Quarterfinals	Saint John Fisher; Geneseo State	W 92–84; L 70–71

=== CIT results ===
The Great Danes have appeared in the CollegeInsider.com Postseason Tournament (CIT) two times. Their combined record is 0–2.

Year	Round	Opponent	Result
2012	First Round	Manhattan	L 79–89
2017	First Round	Saint Peter's	L 55–59

=== CBI results ===
The Great Danes have appeared in the College Basketball Invitational (CBI) one time. Their record is 0–1.

Year	Round	Opponent	Result
2016	First Round	Ohio	L 90–94^{OT}
