= List of 2007–08 NBA season transactions =

The following is a list of all team-to-team transactions that have occurred in the National Basketball Association during the 2007–08 NBA season. It lists what team each player has been traded to, signed by, or claimed by, and for which players or draft picks, if applicable.

== Retirement ==
Date	Name	Team(s) played (years)	Age	Notes	Ref.
June 20	Rick Brunson	Portland Trail Blazers (1997–1998, 2001–2002); New York Knicks (1999–2000, 2000–2001); Boston Celtics (2000); Chicago Bulls (2002–2003, 2003–2004); Toronto Raptors (2003); Los Angeles Clippers (2004–2005); Seattle SuperSonics (2005–2006); Houston Rockets (2006)	35	Joined the Nuggets as player development	
August 17	Eddie Griffin	Houston Rockets (2001–2003); Minnesota Timberwolves (2004–2007)	25	Died of a car accident that day.	
September 26	Corliss Williamson	Sacramento Kings (1995–2000, 2005–2007); Toronto Raptors (2000–2001); Detroit Pistons (2001–2004); Philadelphia 76ers (2004–2005)	33	Joined Arkansas Baptist as an assistant coach.	
October 3	Aaron McKie	Portland Trail Blazers (1994–1997); Detroit Pistons (1997); Philadelphia 76ers (1997–2005); Los Angeles Lakers (2005–2007)	35	Joined the 76ers as an assistant coach.	
November 3	David Wesley	New Jersey Nets (1993–1994); Boston Celtics (1994–1997); Charlotte/New Orleans Hornets (1997–2004); Houston Rockets (2004–2006); Cleveland Cavaliers (2006–2007)	36		
November 24	Bo Outlaw	Los Angeles Clippers (1993–1997); Orlando Magic (1997–2002, 2005–2007); Phoenix Suns (2002–2003, 2004–2005); Memphis Grizzlies (2003–2004)	36		
November 27	Stacey Augmon	Atlanta Hawks (1991–1996); Detroit Pistons (1996–1997); Portland Trail Blazers (1997–2001); Charlotte/New Orleans Hornets (2001–2004); Orlando Magic (2004–2006)	38	Became player development coach for Denver after being waived before season.	
March 30	Chris Webber	Golden State Warriors (1993–1994, 2008); Washington Bullets/Wizards (1994–1998); Sacramento Kings (1998–2005); Philadelphia 76ers (2005–2007); Detroit Pistons (2007)	35	Webber retired due to trouble with his repaired right knee.	

== Trades ==
June
June 14	To Houston Rockets: Mike James; Justin Reed	To Minnesota Timberwolves: Juwan Howard
June 15	To Detroit Pistons: 2 second round draft picks (2009, 2011)	To Toronto Raptors: Carlos Delfino
June 28	To Boston Celtics: Ray Allen; Draft rights to Glen Davis	To Seattle SuperSonics: Wally Szczerbiak; Delonte West; Draft rights to Jeff Green; Second round draft pick (2008), Trent Plaisted
June 28	To Charlotte Bobcats: Jason Richardson; Draft rights to Jermareo Davidson	To Golden State Warriors: Draft rights to Brandan Wright
June 28	To Dallas Mavericks: Draft rights to Reyshawn Terry	To Orlando Magic: Draft rights to Milovan Raković; Cash considerations
June 28	To Houston Rockets: Draft rights to Brad Newley	To Orlando Magic: Cash considerations
June 28	To Houston Rockets: Draft rights to Carl Landry	To Seattle SuperSonics: Future second round draft pick; Cash considerations
June 28	To Indiana Pacers: Draft rights to Stanko Barać	To Miami Heat: Second round draft pick (2009), Marcus Thornton (basketball, born 1987)
June 28	To Miami Heat: Draft Rights to Daequan Cook; second round draft pick (2009); cash considerations	To Philadelphia 76ers: Draft rights to Jason Smith
June 28	To New York Knicks: Dan Dickau; Fred Jones; Zach Randolph	To Portland Trail Blazers: Steve Francis; Channing Frye
June 28	To New York Knicks: Draft rights to Demetris Nichols	To Portland Trail Blazers: Second round draft pick (2008), Ömer Aşık
June 28	To Philadelphia 76ers: Rights to Derrick Byars; cash considerations.	To Portland Trail Blazers: Draft rights to Petteri Koponen
June 28	To Toronto Raptors: Draft rights to Giorgos Printezis	To San Antonio Spurs: Second round draft pick (2008), Goran Dragić
July 11	To Orlando Magic: Rashard Lewis	To Seattle SuperSonics: Conditional second round draft pick
July 11	To Phoenix Suns: Cash considerations	To Portland Trail Blazers: James Jones; Draft rights to Rudy Fernández
July 12	To Houston Rockets: Jackie Butler; Draft rights to Luis Scola	To San Antonio Spurs: Vasileios Spanoulis; Second round draft pick from the 2009, Nando de Colo; Future considerations
July 20	To Phoenix Suns: Second round draft pick from 2008,	To Seattle SuperSonics: Kurt Thomas; 2 first round picks (2008 Serge Ibaka, and 2010 Quincy Pondexter
July 31	To Boston Celtics: Kevin Garnett	To Minnesota Timberwolves: Ryan Gomes; Gerald Green; Al Jefferson; Theo Ratliff; Sebastian Telfair; First round draft pick (2009), Jonny Flynn; A return of a conditional first round draft pick, obtained by Minnesota in the 2006 Ricky Davis–Wally Szczerbiak trade.
September 10	To Denver Nuggets: Steven Hunter; Bobby Jones	To Philadelphia 76ers: Reggie Evans; Draft rights to Ricky Sanchez
September 28	To Dallas Mavericks: Trenton Hassell	To Minnesota Timberwolves: Greg Buckner
September 29	To Cleveland Cavaliers: Cedric Simmons	To New Orleans Hornets: David Wesley
September 30	To New York Knicks: Jared Jordan	To Los Angeles Clippers: Cash
October 24	To Miami Heat: Mark Blount; Ricky Davis	To Minnesota Timberwolves: Michael Doleac; Wayne Simien; Antoine Walker; conditional first round draft pick
October 29	To Minnesota Timberwolves: Beno Udrih	To San Antonio Spurs: Second round pick from (2008)
October 29	To New Jersey Nets: David Wesley	To New Orleans Hornets: Mile Ilić; Bernard Robinson; Cash
November 20	To Los Angeles Lakers: Trevor Ariza	To Orlando Magic: Brian Cook; Maurice Evans
December 14	To Charlotte Bobcats: Nazr Mohammed	To Detroit Pistons: Primož Brezec; Wálter Herrmann
December 29	To Philadelphia 76ers: Gordan Giriček; Future first round pick	To Utah Jazz: Kyle Korver
February 1	To Los Angeles Lakers: Pau Gasol; Future second round draft pick	To Memphis Grizzlies: Kwame Brown; Javaris Crittenton; Aaron McKie; Draft rights to Marc Gasol; Two first round picks (2008, 2010)
February 4	To Memphis Grizzlies: Jason Collins; Cash considerations	To New Jersey Nets: Stromile Swift
February 6	To Miami Heat: Marcus Banks; Shawn Marion	To Phoenix Suns: Shaquille O'Neal
February 16	To Atlanta Hawks: Mike Bibby	To Sacramento Kings: Anthony Johnson; Tyronn Lue; Shelden Williams; Lorenzen Wright; 2008 second round draft pick
February 19	To Dallas Mavericks: Malik Allen; Jason Kidd; Antoine Wright	To New Jersey Nets: Maurice Ager; DeSagana Diop; Devin Harris; Trenton Hassell; Keith Van Horn; Two first round picks (2008 and 2010); Cash considerations
February 20	To San Antonio Spurs: Kurt Thomas	To Seattle SuperSonics: Brent Barry; Francisco Elson; 2009 first round draft pick
February 21	To Houston Rockets: Adam Haluska; Bobby Jackson; Marcus Vinicius; 2008 second round draft pick	To New Orleans Hornets Mike James: Bonzi Wells; Cash considerations
February 21	To Memphis Grizzlies: Marcus Vinicius; Rights to Malick Badiane; Cash considerations	To Houston Rockets: Rights to Sergei Lishouk
February 21	To Detroit Pistons: Juan Dixon	To Toronto Raptors: Primož Brezec
February 21	To Houston Rockets: Gerald Green	To Minnesota Timberwolves: Kirk Snyder
February 21	To Denver Nuggets: Taurean Green	To Portland Trail Blazers: Von Wafer
February 21	To Chicago Bulls: Shannon Brown; Drew Gooden; Larry Hughes; Cedric Simmons	To Cleveland Cavaliers: Joe Smith; Ben Wallace; 2009 second round pick
Three Team Trade
To Cleveland Cavaliers: Wally Szczerbiak; Delonte West	To Seattle SuperSonics: Donyell Marshall; Ira Newble	
To Seattle SuperSonics: Adrian Griffin

== Free Agency ==
The following is a list of player movement via free agency.

Player	Date signed	New team	Former team
Kareem Rush	July 3	Indiana Pacers	BC Lietuvos Rytas (Lithuania)
Stephen Graham	July 3	Indiana Pacers	Portland Trail Blazers
Andre Owens	July 3	Indiana Pacers	Anaheim Arsenal (NBA D-League)
Oleksiy Pecherov	July 5	Washington Wizards	Paris Basket Racing
Marcus Slaughter	July 5	Miami Heat	Pınar Karşıyaka Eurocup
Joel Anthony	July 5	Miami Heat	UNLV (went undrafted in 2007)
Jeremy Richardson	July 5	Miami Heat	Fort Wayne Mad Ants NBA D-League
Mustafa Shakur	July 5	Sacramento Kings	Arizona (undrafted in 2007)
Jamario Moon	July 10	Toronto Raptors	Fuerza Regia (Mexico)
Brandon Wallace	July 10	Boston Celtics	Utah Flash NBA D-League
Chauncey Billups	July 11	Detroit Pistons	
Jason Kapono	July 11	Toronto Raptors	Miami Heat
Devean George	July 12	Dallas Mavericks	
Luke Walton	July 12	Los Angeles Lakers	
Jacque Vaughn	July 12	San Antonio Spurs	
Matt Bonner	July 12	San Antonio Spurs	
Jason Hart	July 13	Utah Jazz	Los Angeles Clippers
Darko Miličić	July 13	Memphis Grizzlies	Orlando Magic
Mike Harris	July 13	Houston Rockets	Al Qadisa
Jerry Stackhouse	July 13	Dallas Mavericks	
Vince Carter	July 13	New Jersey Nets	
Steve Blake	July 13	Portland Trail Blazers	Denver Nuggets
Mikki Moore	July 13	Sacramento Kings	New Jersey Nets
Amir Johnson	July 13	Detroit Pistons	
DeShawn Stevenson	July 16	Washington Wizards	
Chucky Atkins	July 16	Denver Nuggets	Memphis Grizzlies
Andres Nocioni	July 17	Chicago Bulls	
Joe Smith	July 17	Chicago Bulls	Philadelphia 76ers
Matt Carroll	July 17	Charlotte Bobcats	
Cheikh Samb	July 17	Detroit Pistons	WTC Cornellá
Jamaal Magloire	July 17	New Jersey Nets	Portland Trail Blazers
Kelenna Azubuike	July 17	Golden State Warriors	
Fabricio Oberto	July 18	San Antonio Spurs	
Travis Outlaw	July 18	Portland Trail Blazers	
Andre Brown	July 19	Memphis Grizzlies	Seattle SuperSonics
Chris Mihm	July 19	Los Angeles Lakers	
Gerald Wallace	July 19	Charlotte Bobcats	
Morris Peterson	July 23	New Orleans Hornets	Toronto Raptors
Desmond Mason	July 23	Milwaukee Bucks	New Orleans Hornets
Travis Diener	July 23	Indiana Pacers	Orlando Magic
Antonio McDyess	July 23	Detroit Pistons	
Maceo Baston	July 24	Toronto Raptors	Indiana Pacers
Sean Marks	July 24	Phoenix Suns	
Mo Williams	July 24	Milwaukee Bucks	
Casey Jacobsen	July 24	Memphis Grizzlies	Brose Baskets
Sammy Mejia	July 24	Detroit Pistons	DePaul
Ronnie Price	July 26	Utah Jazz	Sacramento Kings
Brandon Bass	July 26	Dallas Mavericks	Tulsa 66ers NBA D-League
Smush Parker	July 27	Miami Heat	Los Angeles Lakers
Coby Karl	July 30	Los Angeles Lakers	Boise State (went undrafted in 2007)
Chuck Hayes	August 3	Houston Rockets	
Kosta Perović	August 3	Golden State Warriors	Partizan Belgrade (Serbia)
Austin Croshere	August 3	Golden State Warriors	Dallas Mavericks
Eddie Jones	August 6	Dallas Mavericks	Miami Heat
Matt Barnes	August 6	Golden State Warriors	
Justin Williams	August 7	Memphis Grizzlies	Dakota Wizards (NBA D-League)
Awvee Storey	August 7	Milwaukee Bucks	Dakota Wizards (NBA D-League)
Jannero Pargo	August 8	New Orleans Hornets	
Penny Hardaway	August 9	Miami Heat	New York Knicks
Eddie House	August 9	Boston Celtics	New Jersey Nets
Scot Pollard	August 9	Boston Celtics	Cleveland Cavaliers
Brevin Knight	August 13	Los Angeles Clippers	Charlotte Bobcats
Josh Powell	August 14	Los Angeles Clippers	Golden State Warriors
Ime Udoka	August 16	San Antonio Spurs	Portland Trail Blazers
Robert Hite	August 16	New Jersey Nets	Miami (FL)
Jarvis Hayes	August 16	Detroit Pistons	Washington Wizards
Andray Blatche	August 17	Washington Wizards	
Donell Taylor	August 16	Washington Wizards	
Mike Hall	August 16	Washington Wizards	
Stephane Lasme	August 16	Golden State Warriors	Capo Libreville (Gabon)
Marvin Williams	August 16	Atlanta Hawks	
Shelden Williams	August 16	Atlanta Hawks	
Ian Mahinmi	August 23	San Antonio Spurs	ÉB Pau-Orthez (France)
Adonal Foyle	August 24	Orlando Magic	Golden State Warriors
Alexander Johnson	August 24	Miami Heat	Memphis Grizzlies
Marcin Gortat	August 27	Orlando Magic	RheinEnergie Cologne (Germany)
James Posey	August 27	Boston Celtics	Miami Heat
D. J. Strawberry	August 28	Phoenix Suns	Maryland
Jeff McInnis	August 29	Charlotte Bobcats	
Ruben Patterson	August 29	Los Angeles Clippers	Milwaukee Bucks
Yi Jianlian	August 29	Milwaukee Bucks	Guangdong Southern Tigers (CBA)
Anthony Carter	August 31	Denver Nuggets	Scafati Basket Italy
Orien Greene	August 31	Sacramento Kings	Indiana Pacers
Glen Davis	September 4	Boston Celtics	LSU
Malik Allen	September 10	New Jersey Nets	Chicago Bulls
Ramon Sessions	September 11	Milwaukee Bucks	Nevada
Calvin Booth	September 12	Philadelphia 76ers	Washington Wizards
Melvin Ely	September 13	New Orleans Hornets	San Antonio Spurs
Elton Brown	September 17	Los Angeles Lakers	Colorado 14ers (NBA D-League)
Charlie Bell RFA	September 17	Miami Heat	Milwaukee Bucks
Royal Ivey	September 18	Milwaukee Bucks	Atlanta Hawks
Charlie Bell	September 20	Milwaukee Bucks	Miami Heat
Michael Ruffin	September 22	Milwaukee Bucks	Washington Wizards
Roger Mason Jr.	September 24	Washington Wizards	
Troy Hudson	September 24	Golden State Warriors	Minnesota Timberwolves
Brian Chase	September 25	Miami Heat	Los Angeles D-Fenders (NBA D-League)
Samaki Walker	September 25	Milwaukee Bucks	UNICS Kazan (Russia)
John Edwards	September 26	Minnesota Timberwolves	Tulsa 66ers (NBA D-League)
Esteban Batista	September 27	Boston Celtics	Atlanta Hawks
Dahntay Jones	September 27	Boston Celtics	Memphis Grizzlies
Dontell Jefferson	September 28	Memphis Grizzlies	Dakota Wizards (NBA D-League)
Kasib Powell	September 28	Memphis Grizzlies	Bosna
Darrick Martin	September 29	Toronto Raptors	Harlem Globetrotters
Devin Brown	September 29	Cleveland Cavaliers	New Orleans Hornets
Marcus Williams	September 29	San Antonio Spurs	Arizona
Chris Richard	September 30	Minnesota Timberwolves	Florida
Andre Patterson	October 1	Los Angeles Lakers	Harlem Globetrotters
Ryan Bowen	October 1	New Orleans Hornets	Ironi Nahariya (Israel)
Trey Johnson	October 1	New Orleans Hornets	Miami Heat (Summer League)
Anthony Richardson (basketball)	October 1	New Orleans Hornets	Florida State
Eric Chenowith	October 1	New Orleans Hornets	Criollos de Caguas (Puerto-Rico)
Gerald Fitch	October 1	Detroit Pistons	Galatasaray Café Crown (Turkey)
Roderick Wilmont	October 1	New York Knicks	Indiana
Jared Jordan	October 1	New York Knicks	Marist
Demetris Nichols	October 1	New York Knicks	Syracuse
Walker Russell Jr.	October 1	New York Knicks	Fort Worth Flyers (NBA D-League)
Eddie Gill	October 1	New Jersey Nets	Dynamo Moscow (Russia)
Jumaine Jones	October 1	New Jersey Nets	Phoenix Suns
Mateen Cleaves	October 1	New Jersey Nets	Bakersfield Jam (NBA D-League)
Rod Benson	October 1	New Jersey Nets	Austin Toros (NBA D-League)
Chris Ellis	October 1	Portland Trail Blazers	Wake Forest
Brent Petway	October 1	Portland Trail Blazers	Michigan
J.R. Pinnock	October 1	Portland Trail Blazers	Los Angeles Lakers
Tony Massenburg	October 1	Washington Wizards	San Antonio Spurs
Jamon Gordon	October 1	Washington Wizards	Dallas Mavericks (Summer League)
Willie Deane	October 1	Washington Wizards	Purdue
Darvin Ham	October 1	Dallas Mavericks	New Jersey Nets
Jared Newson	October 1	Dallas Mavericks	UTM (undrafted)
Jamal Sampson	October 1	Dallas Mavericks	Denver Nuggets
Brian Skinner	October 1	Phoenix Suns	Milwaukee Bucks
Marcus Douthit	October 1	Los Angeles Clippers	Daegu Orions
Kimani Ffriend	October 1	Los Angeles Clippers	Incheon ET Land Black Slamer
Tierre Brown	October 1	Golden State Warriors	Basket Napoli (Italy)
Pat Burke	October 1	Golden State Warriors	Phoenix Suns
Carlos Powell	October 1	Golden State Warriors	South Dragons
Mickael Pietrus	October 1	Golden State Warriors	
Alvin Jones	October 1	Denver Nuggets	Köln 99ers (Germany)
Brad Stricker	October 1	Golden State Warriors	Georgia State (undrafted in 2000)
Anthony Roberson	October 1	Golden State Warriors	Memphis Grizzlies
Jelani McCoy	October 1	Golden State Warriors	Santa Barbara Breakers IBL
Antywane Robinson	October 1	Atlanta Hawks	Golden State Warriors
Steven Smith	October 1	Atlanta Hawks	Philadelphia 76ers
Jamaal Tatum	October 1	Atlanta Hawks	Southern Illinois
Mario West	October 1	Atlanta Hawks	Georgia Tech
Donell Williams	October 2	Los Angeles Clippers	Fayetteville State
Courtney Sims	October 2	Indiana Pacers	Michigan
Lukasz Obrzut	October 2	Indiana Pacers	Kentucky
Kris Lang	October 2	San Antonio Spurs	Virtus Bologna (Italy)
Keith Langford	October 2	San Antonio Spurs	Austin Toros (NBA D-League)
Darius Washington	October 2	San Antonio Spurs	Austin Toros (NBA D-League)
Anthony Lever-Pedroza	October 2	San Antonio Spurs	Mexico
Andre Barrett	October 2	Chicago Bulls	
Joseph Blair	October 2	Chicago Bulls	Armani Jeans Milano
Justin Cage	October 2	Chicago Bulls	Xavier
Thomas Gardner	October 2	Chicago Bulls	VOO Verviers-Pepinster
Jared Homan	October 2	Chicago Bulls	Mersin BŞB. S.K.
Stacey Augmon	October 3	Denver Nuggets	Orlando Magic
Dan Dickeau	October 3	Los Angeles Clippers (signed off waivers)	New York Knicks
Darrell Armstrong	October 5	New Jersey Nets	Indiana Pacers
Allan Houston	October 10	New York Knicks	Retired (rights last owned by New York)
Mike Wilks	October 18	Denver Nuggets	Seattle SuperSonics
Stacey Augmon	October 27	Denver Nuggets (waived on October 23)	
Courtney Sims	October 29	Indiana Pacers (waived on October 25)	
Demetris Nichols	October 29	Cleveland Cavaliers (waived on October 25)	New York Knicks
Sasha Pavlović	October 31	Cleveland Cavaliers (waived on October 25)	
Juwan Howard	November 1	Dallas Mavericks	Houston Rockets
Beno Udrih	November 1	Sacramento Kings	San Antonio Spurs
Eddie Gill	November 16	New Jersey Nets	Dynamo Moscow Russia
D.J. Mbenga	November 17	Golden State Warriors	Dallas Mavericks
Jelani McCoy	November 29	Denver Nuggets	Santa Barbara Breakers (IBL)
Demetris Nichols	December 7	Chicago Bulls (claimed off waivers)	Cleveland Cavaliers (waived on December 5)
Dahntay Jones	December 10	Sacramento Kings	Memphis Grizzlies
Luke Jackson	December 12	Miami Heat	Toronto Raptors
Courtney Sims	December 12	Indiana Pacers	Michigan (went undrafted in 2007)
Richie Frahm	December 14	Los Angeles Clippers	Benetton Treviso
Mike Wilks	December 19	Washington Wizards	Denver Nuggets
Jeremy Richardson	December 20	Memphis Grizzlies	Fort Wayne Mad Ants (D-League)
Jelani McCoy	December 21	Denver Nuggets (waived on December 19)	
Billy Thomas	December 24	New Jersey Nets	Colorado 14ers (D-League)
Marcus Williams	December 26	San Antonio Spurs	
Keith Langford	December 28	San Antonio Spurs	Austin Toros (D-League)
DerMarr Johnson	December 29	San Antonio Spurs	Austin Toros (D-League)
C.J. Watson	January 8	Golden State Warriors (10-day contract)	Rio Grande Valley Vipers (D-League)
Guillermo Diaz	January 8	Los Angeles Clippers	
Bobby Jones	January 10	Memphis Grizzlies	Denver Nuggets
Jeremy Richardson	January 10	San Antonio Spurs	Memphis Grizzlies
C.J. Watson	January 18	Golden State Warriors (second 10-day contract)	
Guillermo Diaz	January 18	Los Angeles Clippers	
Bobby Jones	January 20	Memphis Grizzlies	
Jeremy Richardson	January 20	San Antonio Spurs	
D.J. Mbenga	January 21	Los Angeles Lakers	Golden State Warriors
C.J. Watson	January 28	Golden State Warriors	
Chris Webber	January 28	Golden State Warriors	Detroit Pistons
Earl Boykins	January 31	Charlotte Bobcats	Milwaukee Bucks
D.J. Mbenga	February 1	Los Angeles Lakers (10-day contract)	
Damon Stoudamire	February 3	San Antonio Spurs	Memphis Grizzlies
D.J. Mbenga	February 11	Los Angeles Lakers (2nd 10-day contract)	
Jeremy Richardson	February 18	Atlanta Hawks (10-day contract)	San Antonio Spurs
Bobby Jones	February 26	Houston Rockets	Memphis Grizzlies
Jamaal Magloire	February 26	Dallas Mavericks (Claimed off waivers)	New Jersey Nets (waived on Feb. 22)
P.J. Brown	February 27	Boston Celtics	Chicago Bulls
Nick Fazekas	February 27	Los Angeles Clippers (10-day contract)	Dallas Mavericks
Jeremy Richardson	February 28	Atlanta Hawks (second 10-day contract)	
Mike Wilks	February 29	Seattle SuperSonics (10-day contract)	Washington Wizards
Andre Barrett	March 1	Los Angeles Clippers	Austin Toros (D-League)
Flip Murray	March 1	Indiana Pacers	Detroit Pistons
Billy Thomas	March 2	Cleveland Cavaliers	Colorado 14ers (D-League)
Kaniel Dickens	March 3	Cleveland Cavaliers	Colorado 14ers (D-League)
Linton Johnson	March 3	Phoenix Suns	Tau Ceramica (Spain)
Sam Cassell	March 3	Boston Celtics	Los Angeles Clippers
Chris Andersen	March 4	New Orleans Hornets	Denver Nuggets
Gordon Giriček	March 4	Phoenix Suns	Philadelphia 76ers
Theo Ratliff	March 4	Detroit Pistons	Minnesota Timberwolves
Tyronn Lue	March 4	Dallas Mavericks	Atlanta Hawks
Justin Williams (basketball)	March 7	Houston Rockets	Sacramento Kings
Mike Harris	March 8	Houston Rockets (10-day contract)	DongGuan New Century
Nick Fazekas	March 8	Los Angeles Clippers (10-day contract)	
Jeremy Richardson	March 9	Atlanta Hawks (second 10-day contract)	
Mike Wilks	March 11	Seattle SuperSonics (second 10-day contract)	
Smush Parker	March 12	Los Angeles Clippers	Miami Heat
Bobby Jones	March 12	Miami Heat	Sioux Falls Skyforce (D-League)
Lance Allred	March 13	Cleveland Cavaliers	Idaho Stampede (D-League)
Mike Harris	March 18	Houston Rockets (second 10-day contract)	
Nick Fazekas	March 18	Cleveland Cavaliers (second 10-day contract)	
Blake Ahearn	March 21	Miami Heat (10-day contract)	Dakota Wizards (D-League)
Ira Newble	March 21	Los Angeles Lakers (10-day contract)	Seattle SuperSonics
Stephane Lasme	March 21	Miami Heat (10-day contract)	Golden State Warriors
Loren Woods	March 21	Houston Rockets (10-day contract)	Golden State Warriors
Kasib Powell	March 22	Miami Heat	Sioux Falls Skyforce (D-League)
Brent Barry	March 23	San Antonio Spurs	Seattle SuperSonics
Eddie Gill	March 24	Seattle SuperSonics	Colorado 14ers (D-League)
Lance Allred	March 25	Cleveland Cavaliers (2nd 10-day contract)	
Linton Johnson	March 27	Toronto Raptors	Phoenix Suns
Mike Harris	March 28	Houston Rockets	
Marcus Williams	March 28	Los Angeles Clippers	San Antonio Spurs
Blake Ahearn	March 31	Miami Heat (2nd 10-day contract)	
Stephane Lasme	March 31	Miami Heat (2nd 10-day contract)	
Loren Woods	March 31	Houston Rockets (2nd 10-day contract)	
Ira Newble	April 1	Los Angeles Clippers (2nd 10-day contract)	
Bobby Jones	April 1	San Antonio Spurs (10-day contract)	Miami Heat
Ronald Dupree	April 3	Seattle SuperSonics (10-day contract)	Tulsa 66ers (D-League)
Lance Allred	April 4	Cleveland Cavaliers	
Stephane Lasme	April 10	Miami Heat	
Bobby Jones	April 11	Denver Nuggets (10-day contract)	San Antonio Spurs
Loren Woods	April 11	Houston Rockets	
DerMarr Johnson	April 11	San Antonio Spurs	Austin Toros (D-League)
Blake Ahearn	April 11	Miami Heat	
Ronald Dupree	April 13	Seattle SuperSonics (2nd 10-day contract)	
Linton Johnson	April 16	Phoenix Suns	Toronto Raptors
Billy Thomas	April 16	Cleveland Cavaliers	

== Released ==
=== Waived ===
Player	Date waived	Former team
Daniel Ewing	June 29	Los Angeles Clippers
Orien Greene	June 29	Indiana Pacers
Brevin Knight	June 29	Charlotte Bobcats
Steve Francis	July 11	Portland Trail Blazers
Derek Fisher	July 12	Utah Jazz
Clifford Robinson	July 13	New Jersey Nets
Alexander Johnson	July 13	Memphis Grizzlies
Hassan Adams	July 14	New Jersey Nets
James White	July 23	San Antonio Spurs
Allan Ray	July 27	Boston Celtics
Troy Hudson	August 2	Minnesota Timberwolves
Adonal Foyle	August 13	Golden State Warriors
Will Conroy	August 20	Los Angeles Clippers
Vassilis Spanoulis	August 23	San Antonio Spurs
Anthony Carter	August 29	Denver Nuggets
Pops Mensah-Bonsu	August 31	Dallas Mavericks
Damir Markota	September 7	Milwaukee Bucks
Šarūnas Jasikevičius	September 20	Golden State Warriors
Lynn Greer	September 24	Milwaukee Bucks
D.J. Mbenga	October 30	Dallas Mavericks
David Wesley	October 31	New Jersey Nets
Anthony Tolliver	October 31	Cleveland Cavaliers
Mustafa Shakur	November 1	Sacramento Kings
Orien Greene	November 15	Sacramento Kings
Stephane Lasme	November 17	Golden State Warriors
Bo Outlaw	November 20	Orlando Magic
Mike Wilks	November 28	Denver Nuggets
Courtney Sims	December 4	Indiana Pacers
Demetris Nichols	December 5	Cleveland Cavaliers
Thomas Gardner	December 7	Chicago Bulls
Darryl Watkins	December 10	Sacramento Kings
Eddie Gill	December 12	New Jersey Nets
Penny Hardaway	December 12	Miami Heat
Ruben Patterson	December 13	Los Angeles Clippers
Ronald Dupree	December 14	Detroit Pistons
Tarence Kinsey	December 18	Memphis Grizzlies
Brandon Wallace	December 18	Boston Celtics
Jelani McCoy	December 19	Denver Nuggets
Courtney Sims	December 19	Indiana Pacers
Jelani McCoy	December 27	Denver Nuggets
Darius Washington	December 28	San Antonio Spurs
Marcus Williams	December 29	San Antonio Spurs
Mike Wilks	December 31	Washington Wizards
D.J. Mbenga	January 6	Golden State Warriors
Bobby Jones (basketball, born 1984)	January 7	Denver Nuggets
Richie Frahm	January 7	Los Angeles Clippers
Jeremy Richardson	January 7	Memphis Grizzlies
Billy Thomas	January 7	New Jersey Nets
DerMarr Johnson	January 7	San Antonio Spurs
Keith Langford	January 7	San Antonio Spurs
Damon Stoudamire	January 28	Memphis Grizzlies
Troy Hudson	January 29	Golden State Warriors
Luke Jackson	February 6	Miami Heat
Viktor Khryapa	February 7	Chicago Bulls
Dahntay Jones	February 16	Sacramento Kings
Justin Williams	February 16	Sacramento Kings
Nick Fazekas	February 19	Dallas Mavericks
Brent Barry	February 21	Seattle SuperSonics
Flip Murray	February 22	Detroit Pistons
Jamaal Magloire	February 22	New Jersey Nets
Marcus Vinicius	February 23	Memphis Grizzlies
Adam Haluska	February 26	Houston Rockets
Sam Cassell	February 28	Los Angeles Clippers
Theo Ratliff	February 28	Minnesota Timberwolves
Jeff McInnis	February 29	Charlotte Bobcats
Gordan Giriček	February 29	Philadelphia 76ers
Tyronn Lue	February 29	Sacramento Kings
Ira Newble	February 29	Seattle SuperSonics
Gerald Green	March 8	Houston Rockets
Smush Parker	March 10	Miami Heat
David Noel	March 14	Milwaukee Bucks
Chris Webber	March 26	Golden State Warriors
Darrick Martin	March 27	Toronto Raptors
Aaron Williams	March 28	Los Angeles Clippers
Darius Miles	April 14	Portland Trail Blazers
Aaron McKie	May 9	Memphis Grizzlies

=== Training camp cuts ===
All players listed did not make the final roster.

Atlanta Hawks	Boston Celtics	Charlotte Bobcats	Chicago Bulls	Cleveland Cavaliers
Antywane Robinson; Steven Smith; Jamal Tatum	Esteban Batista; Dahntay Jones; Jackie Manuel	Deji Akendale; Marcus Campbell; Gabe Muoneke; Jameel Watkins; C.J. Watson	Andre Barrett; Joseph Blair; Justin Cage; Jared Homan	Hassan Adams; Noel Felix; Chet Mason; Darius Rice
Dallas Mavericks	Denver Nuggets	Detroit Pistons	Golden State Warriors	Houston Rockets
Darvin Ham; Jared Newson; Jamal Sampson	Stacey Augmon; Alvin Jones; Jelani McCoy; Anthony Robinson; Brad Stricker; Mike Wilks	Gerald Fitch; Sammy Mejia	Tierre Brown; Pat Burke; Carlos Powell	Jackie Butler; Mike Harris; John Lucas III; Justin Reed; Bob Sura
Indiana Pacers	Los Angeles Clippers	Los Angeles Lakers	Memphis Grizzlies	Miami Heat
Darrell Armstrong; Lukasz Obrzut; Courtney Sims	Guillermo Diaz; Marcus Douthit; Kimani Ffriend; Yaroslav Korolev; Donell Williams	Elton Brown; Andre Patterson; Larry Turner	Dontell Jefferson; Kasib Powell	Brian Chase; Devin Green; Jeremy Richardson; Marcus Slaughter
Milwaukee Bucks	Minnesota Timberwolves	New Jersey Nets	New Orleans Hornets	New York Knicks
Samaki Walker	John Edwards; Juwan Howard; Wayne Simien; Beno Udrih	Rod Benson; Mateen Cleaves; Eddie Gill; Robert Hite; Jumaine Jones	Eric Chenowith; Mile Ilić; Trey Johnson; Bernard Robinson	Dan Dickau; Allan Houston; Jared Jordan; Demetris Nichols; Walker Russell Jr.; Roderick Wilmont
Orlando Magic	Philadelphia 76ers	Phoenix Suns	Portland Trail Blazers	Sacramento Kings
Kevin Kruger; Torrell Martin	Shagari Alleyne	Richie Frahm; Rawle Marshall; Doug Thomas	Chris Ellis; Brent Petway; J.R. Pinnock	Rashid Byrd; Nik Caner-Medley; Adam Parada; Brandon Robinson
San Antonio Spurs	Seattle SuperSonics	Toronto Raptors	Utah Jazz	Washington Wizards
Kris Lang; Keith Langford; Anthony Lever-Pedroza; Marcus Williams		Luke Jackson	Damone Brown; Donnell Harvey; Kevin Lyde	Willie Deane; Mike Hall; Tony Massenburg; Donell Taylor

== D-League Assignments ==
Each NBA team can assign their players with 2 years or less of experience to the team's affiliate NBA D-League team. Players with more than two years of experience may be assigned to the D-League with the players' consent.

Player	Date assigned/recalled	Assignment status	NBA team	D-League team
Ramon Sessions	November 8	assigned	Milwaukee Bucks	Tulsa 66ers
Kyrylo Fesenko	November 10	assigned	Utah Jazz	Utah Flash
Steve Novak	November 11	assigned	Houston Rockets	Rio Grande Valley Vipers
Brandon Wallace	November 13	assigned	Boston Celtics	Utah Jazz
JamesOn Curry	November 15	assigned	Chicago Bulls	Iowa Energy
Kosta Perović	November 18	assigned	Golden State Warriors	Bakersfield Jam
Nick Fazekas	November 20	assigned	Dallas Mavericks	Tulsa 66ers
Marcin Gortat	November 20	assigned	Orlando Magic	Anaheim Arsenal
Ian Mahinmi	November 21	assigned	San Antonio Spurs	Austin Toros
Gabe Pruitt	November 23	assigned	Boston Celtics	Utah Flash
Gabe Pruitt	November 26	recalled	Boston Celtics	Utah Flash
Coby Karl	November 28	assigned	Los Angeles Lakers	Los Angeles D-Fenders
Darius Washington	November 29	assigned	San Antonio Spurs	Austin Toros
Alando Tucker	November 29	assigned	Phoenix Suns	New Mexico Thunderbirds
Kyrylo Fesenko	November 30	recalled	Utah Jazz	Utah Flash
Marcin Gortat	December 2	recalled	Orlando Magic	Anaheim Arsenal
Gabe Pruitt	December 3	assigned(2)	Boston Celtics	Utah Flash
Morris Almond	December 6	assigned	Utah Jazz	Utah Flash
Aaron Brooks	December 6	assigned	Houston Rockets	Rio Grande Valley Vipers
Kyrylo Fesenko	December 6	assigned(2)	Utah Jazz	Utah Flash
Taurean Green	December 10	assigned	Portland Trail Blazers	Idaho Stampede
Cheickh Samb	December 10	assigned	Detroit Pistons	Fort Wayne Mad Ants
Darius Washington	December 13	recalled	San Antonio Spurs	Austin Toros
Gabe Pruitt	December 13	recalled(2)	Boston Celtics	Utah Flash
Kyrylo Fesenko	December 13	recalled(2)	Utah Jazz	Utah Flash
Aaron Brooks	December 14	recalled	Houston Rockets	Rio Grande Valley Vipers
Maurice Ager	December 17	assigned	Dallas Mavericks	Tulsa 66ers
JamesOn Curry	December 17	recalled	Chicago Bulls	Iowa Energy
Steve Novak	December 17	recalled	Houston Rockets	Rio Grande Valley Vipers
Demetri Nichols	December 18	assigned	Chicago Bulls	Iowa Energy
D. J. Strawberry	December 18	assigned	Phoenix Suns	New Mexico Thunderbirds
Alando Tucker	December 18	recalled	Phoenix Suns	New Mexico Thunderbirds
Brandon Wallace	December 18	recalled	Boston Celtics	Utah Flash
Demetri Nichols	December 21	assigned	Chicago Bulls	Iowa Energy
Cheickh Samb	December 21	recalled	Detroit Pistons	Fort Wayne Mad Ants
Darius Washington	December 21	assigned(2)	San Antonio Spurs	Austin Toros
Taurean Green	December 22	recalled	Portland Trail Blazers	Idaho Stampede
Saer Sene	December 23	assigned	Seattle SuperSonics	Idaho Stampede
Coby Karl	December 24	recalled	Los Angeles Lakers	Los Angeles D-Fenders
Kyrylo Fesenko	December 27	assigned(3)	Utah Jazz	Utah Flash
Darius Washington	December 28	recalled(2)	San Antonio Spurs	Austin Toros
Cedric Simmons	January 2	assigned	Cleveland Cavaliers	Rio Grande Valley Vipers
Maurice Ager	January 6	recalled	Dallas Mavericks	Tulsa 66ers
JamesOn Curry	January 7	assigned(2)	Chicago Bulls	Iowa Energy
Demetri Nichols	January 7	recalled	Chicago Bulls	Iowa Energy
Kosta Perović	January 7	recalled	Golden State Warriors	Bakersfield Jam
Morris Almond	January 8	recalled	Utah Jazz	Utah Flash
Josh McRoberts	January 9	assigned	Portland Trail Blazers	Idaho Stampede
Shannon Brown	January 11	assigned	Cleveland Cavaliers	Rio Grande Valley Vipers
Alando Tucker	January 11	assigned(2)	Phoenix Suns	New Mexico Thunderbirds
Cedric Simmons	January 11	recalled	Cleveland Cavaliers	Rio Grande Valley Vipers
D. J. Strawberry	January 11	recalled	Phoenix Suns	New Mexico Thunderbirds
Shannon Brown	January 17	recalled	Cleveland Cavaliers	Rio Grande Valley Vipers
David Noel	January 20	assigned	Milwaukee Bucks	Tulsa 66ers
Alando Tucker	January 21	recalled(2)	Phoenix Suns	New Mexico Thunderbirds
Jermareo Davidson	January 24	assigned	Charlotte Bobcats	Sioux Falls Skyforce
JamesOn Curry	January 24	recalled(2)	Chicago Bulls	Iowa Energy
Morris Almond	January 25	assigned(2)	Utah Jazz	Utah Flash
Chris Richard	January 28	assigned	Minnesota Timberwolves	Sioux Falls Skyforce
Ian Mahinmi	January 28	recalled	San Antonio Spurs	Austin Toros
Mickael Gelabale	January 29	assigned	Seattle SuperSonics	Idaho Stampede
Cheickh Samb	January 29	assigned(2)	Detroit Pistons	Fort Wayne Mad Ants
Ramon Sessions	February 1	recalled	Milwaukee Bucks	Tulsa 66ers
Ian Mahinmi	February 1	assigned(2)	San Antonio Spurs	Austin Toros
Josh McRoberts	February 3	recalled	Portland Trail Blazers	Idaho Stampede
Jermareo Davidson	February 8	recalled	Charlotte Bobcats	Sioux Falls Skyforce
Maurice Ager	February 10	assigned(2)	Dallas Mavericks	Tulsa 66ers
Mickael Gelabale	February 12	recalled	Seattle SuperSonics	Idaho Stampede
Nick Fazekas	February 13	recalled	Dallas Mavericks	Tulsa 66ers
Coby Karl	February 14	assigned(2)	Los Angeles Lakers	Los Angeles D-Fenders
Maurice Ager	February 19	recalled(2)	Dallas Mavericks	Tulsa 66ers
Coby Karl	February 19	recalled(2)	Los Angeles Lakers	Los Angeles D-Fenders
Chris Richard	February 19	recalled	Minnesota Timberwolves	Sioux Falls Skyforce
Joel Anthony	February 27	assigned	Miami Heat	Iowa Energy
Daequan Cook	February 27	assigned	Miami Heat	Iowa Energy
Demetris Nichols	February 29	assigned(2)	Chicago Bulls	Iowa Energy
Kosta Perović	March 3	assigned(2)	Golden State Warriors	Bakersfield Jam
Gabe Pruitt	March 4	assigned(2)	Boston Celtics	Utah Flash
Joel Anthony	March 8	recalled	Miami Heat	Iowa Energy
Daequan Cook	March 8	recalled	Miami Heat	Iowa Energy

== Draft ==
=== First round ===
Pick	Player	Date signed	Team	School/club team
1	Greg Oden	July 1	Portland Trail Blazers	Ohio State (Fr.)
2	Kevin Durant	July 2	Seattle SuperSonics	Texas (Fr.)
3	Al Horford	July 9	Washington Wizards	Florida (Jr.)
4	Mike Conley Jr.	July 29	Memphis Grizzlies	Ohio State (Fr.)
5	Jeff Green	July 2	Boston Celtics (traded to Seattle)	Georgetown (Jr.)
6	Yi Jianlian	August 29	Milwaukee Bucks	Guangdong Southern Tigers (China) (born 1987)
7	Corey Brewer	July 5	Minnesota Timberwolves	Florida (Jr.)
8	Brandan Wright	July 5	Charlotte Bobcats (traded to Golden State)	North Carolina (Fr.)
9	Joakim Noah	July 24	Chicago Bulls (from New York)	Florida (Jr.)
10	Spencer Hawes	July 5	Sacramento Kings	Washington (Fr.)
11	Acie Law	July 9	Atlanta Hawks (from Indiana)	Texas A&M (Sr.)
12	Thaddeus Young	July 11	Philadelphia 76ers	Georgia Tech (Fr.)
13	Julian Wright	July 5	New Orleans Hornets	Kansas (So.)
14	Al Thornton	July 5	Los Angeles Clippers	Florida State (Sr.)
15	Rodney Stuckey	July 6	Detroit Pistons (from Orlando)	Eastern Washington (So.)
16	Nick Young	July 3	Washington Wizards	USC (Jr.)
17	Sean Williams	July 9	New Jersey Nets	Boston College (Jr.)
18	Marco Belinelli	July 13	Golden State Warriors	Fortitudo Bologna (Italy) (born 1986)
19	Javaris Crittenton	July 3	Los Angeles Lakers	Georgia Tech (Fr.)
20	Jason Smith	July 11	Miami Heat (traded to Philadelphia)	Colorado State (Jr.)
21	Daequan Cook	July 5	Philadelphia 76ers (from Denver,^{[o]} traded to Miami)^{[c]}	Ohio State (Fr.)
22	Jared Dudley	July 3	Charlotte Bobcats (from Toronto via Cleveland)^{[p]}	Boston College (Sr.)
23	Wilson Chandler	July 27	New York Knicks (from Chicago)^{[l]}	DePaul (So.)
24	Rudy Fernández		Phoenix Suns (from Cleveland via Boston,^{[q]} traded to Portland)^{[d]}	Joventut Badalona (Spain) (born 1985)
25	Morris Almond	July 6	Utah Jazz	Rice (Sr.)
26	Aaron Brooks	July 7	Houston Rockets	Oregon (Sr.)
27	Arron Afflalo	July 4	Detroit Pistons	UCLA (Jr.)
28	Tiago Splitter		San Antonio Spurs	TAU Cerámica (Spain) (born 1985)
29	Alando Tucker	July 7	Phoenix Suns	Wisconsin (Sr.)
30	Petteri Koponen		Philadelphia 76ers (from Dallas via Golden State and Denver,^{[o]} traded to Portland)^{[e]}	Tapiolan Honka (Finland) (born 1988)

=== Round Two ===
Pick	Player	Date signed	Team	School/club team
31	Carl Landry	October 2	Seattle SuperSonics (from Memphis, traded to Houston)	Purdue (Sr.)
32	Gabe Pruitt	August 22	Boston Celtics	USC (Jr.)
33	Marcus Williams	July 7	San Antonio Spurs (from Milwaukee)	Arizona (So.)
34	Nick Fazekas	July 26	Dallas Mavericks (from Atlanta)	Nevada (Sr.)
35	Glen Davis	August 31	Seattle SuperSonics (traded to Boston)	LSU (Jr.)
36	Jermareo Davidson	July 19	Golden State Warriors (from Minnesota,	Alabama (Sr.)
37	Josh McRoberts	July 1	Portland Trail Blazers	Duke (So.)
38	Kyrylo Fesenko	August 15	Philadelphia 76ers (from New York via Chicago, Utah)	SK Cherkassy (Ukraine) (born 1986)
39	Stanko Barać		Miami Heat (from Sacramento via Utah and Orlando, traded to Indiana)	Široki Brijeg (Bosnia and Herzegovina) (born 1986)
40	Sun Yue		Los Angeles Lakers (from Charlotte)	Duke (So.)
41	Chris Richard	August 30	Minnesota Timberwolves (from Philadelphia)	Florida (Sr.)
42	Derrick Byars	September 11	Los Angeles Lakers	Duke (So.)
43	Adam Haluska		New Orleans Hornets	Iowa (Sr.)
44	Reyshawn Terry		Orlando Magic (traded to Dallas)	North Carolina (Sr.)
45	Jared Jordan		Los Angeles Clippers	Marist (Sr.)
46	Stephane Lasme	August 16	Golden State Warriors (from New Jersey)	Massachusetts (Sr.)
47	Dominic McGuire	August 13	Washington Wizards	Fresno State (Jr.)
48	Marc Gasol		Los Angeles Lakers	Spain
49	Aaron Gray	July 25	Chicago Bulls (from Golden State via Phoenix, Boston, and Denver)	Pittsburgh (Sr.)
50	Renaldas Seibutis		Dallas Mavericks (from Miami via LA Lakers)	Greece
51	JamesOn Curry	July 25	Chicago Bulls (from Denver)	Oklahoma State (Jr.)
52	Taurean Green	July 1	Portland Trail Blazers (from Toronto)	Florida (Jr.)
53	Demetris Nichols		Portland Trail Blazers (from Bulls, traded to New York)	Syracuse (Sr.)
54	Brad Newley		Houston Rockets (from Cleveland via Orlando)	Australia
55	Herbert Hill		Utah Jazz (traded to Philadelphia)	Providence (Sr.)
56	Ramon Sessions	September 11	Milwaukee Bucks (from Houston)	Nevada (Jr.)
57	Sammy Mejia		Detroit Pistons	DePaul (Sr.)
58	Giorgos Printezis		San Antonio Spurs (traded to Toronto)	Greece
59	D. J. Strawberry	August 13	Phoenix Suns	Maryland (Sr.)
60	Milovan Raković		Dallas Mavericks (traded to Orlando)	Serbia

=== Previous years draftees ===
Draft	Pick	Player	Date signed	Team	Previous team
2002	55	Luis Scola	July 14	Houston Rockets	Ferro Carril Oeste (Argentina)
2006	52	Guillermo Diaz	August 16	Los Angeles Clippers	Olympiada Patras (Greece)

== See also ==
- 2007–08 NBA season
- 2007 NBA draft
- 2007 in sports
- 2008 in sports
