= 2001–02 UCLA Bruins men's basketball team =

American college basketball season

2001–02 UCLA Bruins men's basketball

NCAA tournament, Sweet Sixteen
- Conference: Pacific-10

Ranking
- Coaches: No. 20
- Record: 21–12 (11–7 Pac-10)
- Head coach: Steve Lavin
- Assistant coaches: Michael Holton; Jim Saia; Steve Spencer
- Home arena: Pauley Pavilion

2001–02 Pacific-10 Conference men's basketball standings
	Conf.				Overall
Team	W		L	PCT	W		L	PCT
No. 6 Oregon	14	–	4	.778	26	–	9	.743
California	12	–	6	.667	23	–	9	.719
No. 10 Arizona†	12	–	6	.667	24	–	10	.706
No. 18 USC	12	–	6	.667	22	–	10	.688
Stanford	12	–	6	.667	20	–	10	.667
No. 20 UCLA	11	–	7	.611	21	–	12	.636
Arizona State	7	–	11	.389	12	–	15	.444
Washington	5	–	13	.278	11	–	17	.393
Oregon State	4	–	14	.222	11	–	17	.393
Washington State	1	–	17	.056	6	–	21	.222
† Conference tournament winner As of July 10, 2011; Rankings from Coaches Poll

The 2001–02 UCLA Bruins men's basketball team represented the University of California, Los Angeles in the 2001–02 NCAA Division I men's basketball season. The team finished 6th in the conference and lost in the first round of the Pac-10 tournament to the California Golden Bears. The Bruins competed in the 2002 NCAA Division I men's basketball tournament, losing to the Missouri Tigers in the sweet sixteen.

== Roster ==
2001–02 UCLA Bruins men's basketball team
Players
Coaches

Pos.	#	Name	Height	Weight	Year	Hometown
G	13	Gene Barnes	5 ft 10 in (1.78 m)	—	Fr
F	23	Matt Barnes	6 ft 7 in (2.01 m)	226 lb (103 kg)	Sr	Santa Clara, California
G	21	Cedric Bozeman	6 ft 6 in (1.98 m)	215 lb (98 kg)	Fr	Los Angeles, California
F	43	T. J. Cummings	6 ft 10 in (2.08 m)	223 lb (101 kg)	So	Homewood, Illinois
C	50	Dan Gadzuric	6 ft 11 in (2.11 m)	240 lb (109 kg)	Sr	The Hague, Netherlands
G	55	Quinn Hawking	6 ft 4 in (1.93 m)	—	Fr
G	22	Rico Hines (C)	6 ft 5 in (1.96 m)	—	Sr	Greenville, North Carolina
C	52	John Hoffart	6 ft 10 in (2.08 m)	—	So
F	54	Josiah Johnson	6 ft 8 in (2.03 m)	—	Fr
F	24	Jason Kapono	6 ft 8 in (2.03 m)	215 lb (98 kg)	Jr	Long Beach, California
G	3	Billy Knight	6 ft 6 in (1.98 m)	—	Sr
F	5	Andre Patterson	6 ft 7 in (2.01 m)	—	Fr	Los Angeles, California
G	2	Janou Rubin	6 ft 3 in (1.91 m)	—	So
G	1	Dijon Thompson	6 ft 7 in (2.01 m)	193 lb (88 kg)	Fr	Los Angeles, California
G	10	Ryan Walcott	6 ft 1 in (1.85 m)	—	Fr
F	34	Ray Young	6 ft 4 in (1.93 m)	—	Sr

Head coach

Steve Lavin (Chapman)

Assistant coach(es)

- Michael Holton (UCLA)
- Jim Saia (Chapman)
- Steve Spencer (Somona State)

Legend

- (C) Team captain
- (S) Suspended
- (I) Ineligible
- (W) Walk-on
- Injured
- Current redshirt

=== Starting lineup ===
Cedric Bozeman (Fr.), Point Guard

Billy Knight (Sr.), Shooting Guard

Jason Kapono (Jr.), Small Forward

Matt Barnes (Sr.), Power Forward

Dan Gadzuric (Sr.), Center

=== Bench ===
T. J. Cummings (So.)

Rico Hines (Sr.)

John Hoffart (So.)

Josiah Johnson (Fr.)

Andre Patterson (Fr.)

Dijon Thompson (Fr.)

Ryan Walcott (Fr.)

== Awards And Honors ==
- Jason Kapono
  - AP Honorable-Mention All-American
  - First-Team All-Pac-10
  - First-Team USBWA All-District 9.
  - First-Team NABC All-District 15.
  - Naismith College Player of the Year Finalist
  - Team Co-Most Valuable Player
- Dan Gadzuric
  - Honorable-Mention All-Pac-10
  - Team Co-Most Valuable Player
- Cedric Bozeman
  - Honorable-Mention Pac-10 All-Freshman Team
- Matt Barnes
  - Second-Team NABC All-District 15.
  - Team Co-Most Valuable Player
- Billy Knight
  - Team Co-Most Valuable Player

== Schedule ==
Date time, TV	Rank^{#}	Opponent^{#}	Result	Record	Site city, state
Exhibition
November 8, 2001*; 7:30 p.m.		EA Sports All-Stars	W 102–77		Pauley Pavilion; Los Angeles, CA
November 14, 2001*; 7:30 p.m.		Global Sports	W 86–60		Pauley Pavilion; Los Angeles, CA
Regular Season
November 19, 2001*; 6:30 p.m., ESPN2	No. 3	vs. Houston; Maui Invitational	W 71–60	1–0	Lahaina Civic Center (2,500); Maui, HI
November 20, 2001*; 4:30 p.m., ESPN	No. 3	vs. Ball State; Maui Invitational	L 73–91	1–1	Lahaina Civic Center (2,500); Maui, Hawaii
November 21, 2001*	No. 3	vs. South Carolina; Maui Invitational	W 89–77	2–1	Lahaina Civic Center (2,500); Maui, HI
November 28, 2001*; 7:30 p.m., FSNW	No. 10	Pepperdine	L 78–85	2–2	Pauley Pavilion (8,376); Los Angeles, CA
December 5, 2001*; 7:30 p.m., FSNW2	No. 20	UC Riverside	W 65–50	3–2	Pauley Pavilion (6,704); Los Angeles, CA
December 8, 2001*; 3:30 p.m., KCAL 9	No. 20	vs. No. 16 Alabama; John R. Wooden Classic	W 79–57	4–2	Arrowhead Pond of Anaheim (16,221); Anaheim, CA
December 15, 2001*; 1:00 p.m., FSNW2	No. 17	UC Irvine	W 75–74	5–2	Pauley Pavilion (7,397); Los Angeles, CA
December 20, 2001; 7:30 p.m., FSN	No. 19	at Washington	W 85–79	6–2 (1–0)	Hec Edmundson Pavilion (7,215); Seattle, WA
December 22, 2001; 12:00 p.m., FSN	No. 19	at Washington State	W 79–74	7–2 (2–0)	Beasley Coliseum (2,410); Pullman, WA
December 27, 2001*; 7:30 p.m.	No. 15	Columbia	W 64–55	8–2	Pauley Pavilion (8,990); Los Angeles, CA
December 29, 2001*; 1:00 p.m., CBS	No. 15	No. 20 Georgetown	W 98–91	9–2	Pauley Pavilion (10,423); Los Angeles, CA
January 4, 2002; 7:30 p.m., FSNW2	No. 14	Washington	W 74–62	10–2 (3–0)	Pauley Pavilion (7,567); Los Angeles, CA
January 6, 2002; 1:00 p.m., FSN	No. 14	Washington State	W 81–69	11–2 (4–0)	Pauley Pavilion (8,834); Los Angeles, CA
January 10, 2002; 7:30 p.m., FSN	No. 11	at USC	L 77–81	11–3 (4–1)	Great Western Forum (15,903); Los Angeles, CA
January 12, 2002*; 12:00 p.m., CBS	No. 11	No. 1 Kansas	W 87–77	12–3	Pauley Pavilion (12,280); Los Angeles
January 17, 2002; 6:30 p.m., FSNW2	No. 9	at Arizona State	W 82–79	13–3 (5–1)	Wells Fargo Arena (9,013); Tempe, AZ
January 19, 2002; 12:00 p.m., CBS	No. 9	at No. 15 Arizona	L 86–96	13–4 (5–2)	McKale Center (14,571); Tucson, AZ
January 24, 2002; 7:30 p.m., FSN	No. 13	No. 17 Stanford	L 76–86	13–5 (5–3)	Pauley Pavilion (12,243); Los Angeles, CA
January 26, 2002; 5:00 p.m., FSN	No. 13	California	W 64–57	14–5 (6–3)	Pauley Pavilion (12,275); Los Angeles, CA
January 31, 2002; 7:30 p.m., FSN	No. 13	at Oregon	L 62–91	14–6 (6–4)	McArthur Court (9,087); Eugene, OR
February 2, 2002; 7:05 p.m., FSNW2	No. 13	at Oregon State	W 70–48	15–6 (7–4)	Gill Coliseum (9,039); Corvallis, OR
February 6, 2002; 7:30 p.m., FSNW2	No. 15	No. 25 USC	W 67–65	16–6 (8–4)	Pauley Pavilion (12,810); Los Angeles, CA
February 9, 2002*; 1:00 p.m., CBS	No. 15	at Villanova	L 57–58	16–7	The Pavilion (6,500); Philadelphia, PA
February 14, 2002; 7:30 p.m., FSN	No. 20	No. 9 Arizona	W 77–76	17–7 (9–4)	Pauley Pavilion (11,960); Los Angeles, CA
February 16, 2002; 12:00 p.m., ABC	No. 20	Arizona State	L 68–69	17–8 (9–5)	Pauley Pavilion (9,823); Los Angeles, CA
February 21, 2002; 7:30 p.m., FSNW2	No. 25	at California	L 51–69	17–9 (9–6)	Haas Pavilion (12,000); Berkeley, CA
February 23, 2002; 1:00 p.m., CBS	No. 25	at No. 10 Stanford	W 95–92	18–9 (10–6)	Maples Pavilion (7,391); Stanford, CA
February 28, 2002; 7:30 p.m.		Oregon State	W 65–57	19–9 (11–6)	Pauley Pavilion (8,959); Los Angeles, CA
March 2, 2002; 1:00 p.m., CBS		No. 13 Oregon	L 62–65	19–10 (11–7)	Pauley Pavilion (11,680); Los Angeles, CA
Pacific-10 Tournament
March 7, 2002; 9:00 p.m., FSN	(6)	vs. (3) No. 25 California; First Round	L 61–67	19–11	Staples Center (17,839); Los Angeles, CA
NCAA tournament
March 15, 2002*; 7:55 p.m., CBS	(8 W)	vs. (9 W) Mississippi; First Round	W 80–58	20–11	Mellon Arena (17,232); Pittsburgh, PA
March 17, 2002*; 10:10 a.m., CBS	(8 W)	vs. (1 W) No. 5 Cincinnati; Second Round	W 105–101 ^{2OT}	21–11	Mellon Arena (17,232); Pittsburgh, PA
March 21, 2002*; 8:15 p.m., CBS	(8 W)	vs. (12 W) Missouri; Sweet Sixteen	L 73–82	21–12	Compaq Center (18,040); San Jose, CA
*Non-conference game. ^{#}Rankings from AP Poll. (#) Tournament seedings in parentheses. All times are in Pacific Time.
