= UT Martin Skyhawks men's basketball statistical leaders =

The UT Martin Skyhawks men's basketball statistical leaders are individual statistical leaders of the UT Martin Skyhawks men's basketball program in various categories, including points, assists, blocks, rebounds, and steals. Within those areas, the lists identify single-game, single-season, and career leaders. The Skyhawks represent the University of Tennessee at Martin in the NCAA Division I Ohio Valley Conference.

UT Martin began competing in intercollegiate basketball in 1951, initially as a member of the Volunteer State Athletic Conference and competing in the NAIA. The Skyhawks, nicknamed "Pacers" before 1995–96, joined the NCAA in 1971 as a member of the Gulf South Conference, then competing in the NCAA College Division. When the NCAA split the College Division in 1973, creating the limited-scholarship Division II and the non-scholarship Division III, the Gulf South, including UT Martin, moved to Division II. The Pacers moved to Division I in 1991. This history is significant because the official recording of statistics began at different times in different organizations, as well as different NCAA divisions.

The NAIA record books do not indicate when the organization began officially recording statistics on a national basis, but its current records (as of 2019–20) for single-game and single-season assists were both set in 1972–73, and the career record for blocks dates to 1975. The NCAA had recorded individual assists for two seasons in the early 1950s, but did not resume doing so until 1983–84, and even then only in Division I. The NCAA did not begin officially recording assists in its two lower divisions until 1988–89. As for blocks and steals, they were first recorded in D-I in that same 1988–89 season; by the time those statistics were recorded in D-II and D-III (1992–93), UT Martin had joined D-I. The UT Martin record books include players in all named statistics, regardless of whether they were officially recorded by any of the governing bodies in which the school was a member.

These lists are updated through the end of the 2020–21 season.

== Scoring ==
Career
Rk	Player	Points	Seasons
1	Myles Taylor	1734	2011–12 2012–13 2013–14 2014–15 2015–16
2	Mike Meschede	1729	1984–85 1985–86 1986–87 1987–88
3	Lester Hudson	1727	2007–08 2008–09
4	DeWayne Powell	1626	1992–93 1993–94 1994–95 1995–96
5	Mike Liabo	1523	2010–11 2011–12 2012–13 2013–14
6	Jared Newson	1347	2003–04 2004–05 2005–06
7	Mitch Stentiford	1332	1981–82 1982–83 1983–84
8	Marquis Weddle	1304	2007–08 2008–09 2009–10
9	Jeremy Kelly	1213	2001–02 2002–03 2003–04 2005–06
10	Jordan Sears	1181	2022–23 2023–24

Season
Rk	Player	Points	Season
1	Lester Hudson	880	2008–09
2	Lester Hudson	847	2007–08
3	Jordan Sears	692	2023–24
4	Mike Meschede	664	1987–88
5	Marcus Glass	625	1985–86
6	Michael Hart	616	1995–96
7	Jacob Crews	612	2023–24
8	Quintin Dove	586	2019–20
9	Jerry Davis	573	1982–83
10	Jacolby Mobley	566	2016–17

Single game
Rk	Player	Points	Season	Opponent
1	Okechi Egbe	44	2000–01	Bethel

== Rebounds ==
Career
Rk	Player	Rebounds	Seasons
1	Mike Rudolphi	794	1967–68 1968–69 1969–70
2	Myles Taylor	765	2011–12 2012–13 2013–14 2014–15 2015–16
3	Ryan DeMichael	649	1995–96 1996–97 1997–98 1998–99
4	Will Lewis	592	2003–04 2004–05 2005–06 2006–07
5	Darrell Smith	567	1980–81 1981–82
6	Marcus Glass	564	1984–85 1985–86
7	Cleve Woodfork	545	2003–04 2004–05 2005–06 2006–07
8	Jared Newson	535	2003–04 2004–05 2005–06
9	Lester Hudson	513	2007–08 2008–09
10	Javier Martinez	512	2013–14 2014–15 2015–16 2016–17

Season
Rk	Player	Rebounds	Season
1	Marcus Glass	320	1985–86
2	Gus Rudolph	315	1982–83
3	Mike Rudolphi	313	1968–69
4	Darrell Smith	305	1980–81
	Mike Rudolphi	305	1969–70
6	Fred Sanders	291	1972–73
7	Roy Cotton	267	1987–88
8	Javier Martinez	266	2016–17
9	Jacob Crews	263	2023–24
10	Darrell Smith	262	1981–82
	Issa Muhammad	262	2023–24

Single game
Rk	Player	Rebounds	Season	Opponent
1	Darrell Smith	27	1980–81	Maryville

== Assists ==
Career
Rk	Player	Assists	Seasons
1	Kyle Herrin	424	1983–84 1984–85 1985–86 1986–87
2	Larry Martin	369	1981–82 1982–83
3	Jeremy Kelly	359	2001–02 2002–03 2003–04 2005–06
4	Arthur Boykin	339	1972–73 1973–74 1974–75
5	DeWayne Powell	330	1992–93 1993–94 1994–95 1995–96
6	Terry Pearcy	287	1974–75 1975–76 1976–77 1977–78
7	Lester Hudson	283	2007–08 2008–09
8	Andrae Betts	260	1998–99 1999–00
9	Mike Meschede	257	1984–85 1985–86 1986–87 1987–88
10	Mike Liabo	247	2010–11 2011–12 2012–13 2013–14

Season
Rk	Player	Assists	Season
1	Larry Martin	209	1982–83
2	Eric Rivers	160	1985–86
	Larry Martin	160	1981–82
4	Kyle Herrin	159	1984–85
5	Delrico Lane	158	2008–09
6	Jair Peralta	155	2001–02
7	Deville Smith	153	2014–15
8	Ryan Owens	148	1995–96
	Lester Hudson	148	2007–08
10	Tyler George	146	2003–04

Single game
Rk	Player	Assists	Season	Opponent
1	Kyle Herrin	16	1986–87	Miles

== Steals ==
Career
Rk	Player	Steals	Seasons
1	DeWayne Powell	263	1992–93 1993–94 1994–95 1995–96
2	Jeremy Kelly	175	2001–02 2002–03 2003–04 2005–06
3	Lester Hudson	169	2007–08 2008–09
4	Mike Meschede	154	1984–85 1985–86 1986–87 1987–88
5	Andrae Betts	132	1998–99 1999–00
6	Larry Martin	131	1981–82 1982–83
7	Jared Newson	128	2003–04 2004–05 2005–06
8	Marcus Washington	120	1988–89 1989–90 1990–91 1991–92
9	Jon Roos	117	1999–00 2000–01 2001–02 2002–03
10	Reuben Clayton	116	2008–09 2009–10 2010–11

Season
Rk	Player	Steals	Season
1	Lester Hudson	94	2007–08
2	Lester Hudson	75	2008–09
3	William McFadden	74	1996–97
	Andrae Betts	74	1999–00
5	Larry Martin	73	1981–82
6	Delrico Lane	72	2008–09
7	DeWayne Powell	69	1993–94
8	DeWayne Powell	68	1994–95
9	DeWayne Powell	65	1992–93
10	Vladimer Salaridze	64	2024–25

Single game
Rk	Player	Steals	Season	Opponent
1	Lester Hudson	10	2007–08	Central Baptist

== Blocks ==
Career
Rk	Player	Blocks	Seasons
1	Jack Bendure	183	1969–70 1970–71 1971–72
2	Jeremy Sargent	126	2000–01 2001–02
	Ryan DeMichael	126	1995–96 1996–97 1997–98 1998–99
4	Roy Cotton	88	1986–87 1987–88
5	Myles Taylor	84	2011–12 2012–13 2013–14 2014–15 2015–16
6	Fred Sanders	77	1971–72 1972–73
7	KJ Simon	73	2021–22 2022–23
8	Marcus Glass	70	1984–85 1985–86
9	Will Lewis	64	2003–04 2004–05 2005–06 2006–07
10	Kenan Asceric	60	2000–01 2001–02 2002–03 2003–04

Season
Rk	Player	Blocks	Season
1	Jack Bendure	78	1969–70
2	Jeremy Sargent	74	2001–02
3	Jack Bendure	66	1970–71
4	Ryan DeMichael	52	1997–98
	Jeremy Sargent	52	2000–01
6	Roy Cotton	50	1987–88
7	Ryan DeMichael	49	1998–99
8	KJ Simon	41	2021–22
9	Jack Bendure	39	1971–72
	Fred Sanders	39	1971–72

Single game
Rk	Player	Blocks	Season	Opponent
1	Jack Bendure	11	1969–70	Union
