= 2001–02 California Golden Bears men's basketball team =

American college basketball season

2001–02 California Golden Bears men's basketball

NCAA tournament, second round
- Conference: Pacific-10 Conference
- Record: 23–9 (12–6 Pac-10)
- Head coach: Ben Braun (6th season)
- Assistant coach: Joe Pasternack (1st season)
- Home arena: Harmon Gym

2001–02 Pacific-10 Conference men's basketball standings
	Conf.				Overall
Team	W		L	PCT	W		L	PCT
No. 6 Oregon	14	–	4	.778	26	–	9	.743
California	12	–	6	.667	23	–	9	.719
No. 10 Arizona†	12	–	6	.667	24	–	10	.706
No. 18 USC	12	–	6	.667	22	–	10	.688
Stanford	12	–	6	.667	20	–	10	.667
No. 20 UCLA	11	–	7	.611	21	–	12	.636
Arizona State	7	–	11	.389	12	–	15	.444
Washington	5	–	13	.278	11	–	17	.393
Oregon State	4	–	14	.222	11	–	17	.393
Washington State	1	–	17	.056	6	–	21	.222
† Conference tournament winner As of July 10, 2011; Rankings from Coaches Poll

The 2001–02 California Golden Bears men's basketball team represented the University of California, Berkeley during the 2001–02 season.

Led by head coach Ben Braun, the Bears finished the regular season with a 12–6 record in the Pac-10, placing them in second. They received an at-large bid to the NCAA tournament where they defeated No. 11 seed Penn before falling to No. 3 seed Pittsburgh in the second round. The team finished the season with an overall record of 23–9.

== Roster ==
2001–02 California Golden Bears men's basketball team
Players
Coaches

Pos.	#	Name	Height	Weight	Year	Hometown
G	15	Dennis Gates	6 ft 3 in (1.91 m)	195 lb (88 kg)	Sr	Country Club Hills, Illinois
G	25	Brian Wethers	6 ft 5 in (1.96 m)	210 lb (95 kg)	Jr	Murietta, California
F	31	Jamal Sampson	6 ft 11 in (2.11 m)	235 lb (107 kg)	Fr	Inglewood, California
F	34	Joe Shipp	6 ft 5 in (1.96 m)	220 lb (100 kg)	Jr	Los Angeles, California

Head coach

- Ben Braun

Assistant coach(es)

- Joe Pasternack

Legend

- (C) Team captain
- (S) Suspended
- (I) Ineligible
- (W) Walk-on
- Injured
- Current redshirt

== Schedule and results ==
Date time, TV	Rank^{#}	Opponent^{#}	Result	Record	Site city, state
Regular season
Pac-10 Tournament
Mar 7, 2002*	(3) No. 25	(6) UCLA; Quarterfinals	W 67–61	22–7	Haas Pavilion; Berkeley, California
Mar 8, 2002*	(3) No. 25	at (2) No. 15 Arizona; Semifinals	L 78–90	22–8	McKale Center; Tucson, Arizona
NCAA Tournament
Mar 15, 2002*	(6 S)	vs. (11 S) Penn; First Round	W 82–75	23–8	Mellon Arena; Pittsburgh, Pennsylvania
Mar 17, 2002*	(6 S)	vs. (3 S) No. 9 Pittsburgh; Second Round	L 50–63	23–9	Mellon Arena; Pittsburgh, Pennsylvania
*Non-conference game. ^{#}Rankings from AP Poll. (#) Tournament seedings in parentheses. S=South. All times are in Pacific.

== Team players in the 2002 NBA draft ==
Round	Pick	Player	NBA team
2	47	Jamal Sampson	Utah Jazz
