= Andre Patterson =

Andre Patterson may refer to:

- Andre Patterson (American football) (born 1960), American football coach
- Andre Patterson (basketball) (born 1983), American professional basketball player

== See also ==
- Andrae Patterson (born 1975), American professional basketball player
