= Rico Hines =

American basketball coach (born 1978)

Philadelphia 76ers
- Position: Assistant coach
- League: NBA

Personal information
- Born: February 17, 1978 (age 48) Greenville, North Carolina, U.S.

Career information
- High school: Hargrave (Chatham, Virginia); Saint John's (Buckeystown, Maryland); D. H. Conley (Greenville, North Carolina)
- College: UCLA (1997–2002)
- Coaching career: 2006–present

Career history

Coaching
- 2006–2010: Golden State Warriors (assistant)
- 2010–2015: St. John's (assistant)
- 2016–2019: Reno Bighorns/Stockton Kings (assistant)
- 2020–2022: Sacramento Kings (assistant/Player Development)
- 2022–2023: Toronto Raptors (assistant)
- 2023–present: Philadelphia 76ers (assistant)

DaRico Travone Hines (born February 17, 1978) is an American basketball coach who is an assistant coach for the Philadelphia 76ers of the National Basketball Association (NBA). He played college basketball with the UCLA Bruins.

== College career ==
Hines received a bachelor's degree in history from the University of California, Los Angeles, in 2002, with a minor in African-American studies. His time as a basketball player there overlapped with future NBA star Baron Davis, among others.

== Coaching career ==
From 2006 to 2010, Hines was a player/athletic development assistant for the NBA's Golden State Warriors where he worked under then head coach Don Nelson. He was able to reunite with and instruct former college teammates Baron Davis and Matt Barnes.

From 2010 to 2015, he was with the St John's Red Storm as an assistant coach under head coach Steve Lavin.

On September 28, 2016, Hines was named assistant coach of the Reno Bighorns of the NBA Development League. In 2019, he was promoted to being the Director of Player Development alongside his coaching duties.

In 2022, Hines left the Kings organization and announced he would be part of the Raptors' staff. Another UCLA teammate, Earl Watson, was entering his second season coaching with the team. He was also familiar with incumbent All-Star Pascal Siakam, who he trained to usher in a breakout performance for in 2018–19.

He spent one season with Toronto before following former Raptors coach Nick Nurse to the Philadelphia 76ers as an assistant.

During offseasons, Hines orchestrates well-documented summer pick-up games at UCLA known as Rico Hines Runs. They feature NBA players and others from overseas leagues and frequently circulate online.

== Personal life ==
Hines married actress Tichina Arnold on August 18, 2012. Arnold is best known for her role as Pamela James in the FOX sitcom Martin (1992–97). In January 2016, Tichina Arnold told People Magazine that she and Hines were divorcing.

Hines married Banking Executive Kathleen Olson on August 2, 2025.
