= 2001–02 Oregon Ducks men's basketball team =

American college basketball season

2001–02 Oregon Ducks men's basketball

Pac-10 Regular Season Champions

NCAA tournament, Elite Eight
- Conference: Pacific-10 Conference

Ranking
- Coaches: No. 6
- AP: No. 11
- Record: 26–9 (14–4 Pac-10)
- Head coach: Ernie Kent (5th season)
- Assistant coaches: Mark Hudson; Kenny Payne
- Home arena: McArthur Court

2001–02 Pacific-10 Conference men's basketball standings
	Conf.				Overall
Team	W		L	PCT	W		L	PCT
No. 6 Oregon	14	–	4	.778	26	–	9	.743
California	12	–	6	.667	23	–	9	.719
No. 10 Arizona†	12	–	6	.667	24	–	10	.706
No. 18 USC	12	–	6	.667	22	–	10	.688
Stanford	12	–	6	.667	20	–	10	.667
No. 20 UCLA	11	–	7	.611	21	–	12	.636
Arizona State	7	–	11	.389	12	–	15	.444
Washington	5	–	13	.278	11	–	17	.393
Oregon State	4	–	14	.222	11	–	17	.393
Washington State	1	–	17	.056	6	–	21	.222
† Conference tournament winner As of July 10, 2011; Rankings from Coaches Poll

The 2001–02 Oregon Ducks men's basketball team represented the University of Oregon as a member of the Pacific-10 Conference during the 2001–02 NCAA Division I men's basketball season. The team was led by head coach Ernie Kent and played their home games at McArthur Court in Eugene, Oregon. The Ducks won the Pac-10 regular season title, received an at-large bid to the NCAA tournament and made a run to the Elite Eight, and finished with a record of 26–9 (14–4 Pac-10).

== Roster ==
2001–02 Oregon Ducks men's basketball team
Players
Coaches

Pos.	#	Name	Height	Weight	Year	Hometown
G	13	Luke Ridnour	6 ft 2 in (1.88 m)	170 lb (77 kg)	So	Blaine, Washington
G	20	Fred Jones	6 ft 4 in (1.93 m)	210 lb (95 kg)	Sr	Gresham, Oregon
G	33	Luke Jackson	6 ft 7 in (2.01 m)	210 lb (95 kg)	So	Creswell, Oregon

Head coach

- Ernie Kent (Oregon)

Assistant coach(es)

Legend

- (C) Team captain
- (S) Suspended
- (I) Ineligible
- (W) Walk-on
- Injured
- Current redshirt

== Schedule and results ==
Date	Opponent	Rank	Site	Result	Record
11/15/2001	Alabama State		McArthur Court-Eugene, OR	W 92–52	1–0
11/16/2001	Western Michigan		McArthur Court-Eugene, OR	W 91–48	2–0
11/17/2001	Long Beach State		McArthur Court-Eugene, OR	W 97–67	3–0
11/24/2001	Louisville		Moda Center-Portland, OR	W 90–63	4–0
11/27/2001	U-Mass		MassMutual Center-Springfield, MA	L 62–58	4–1
12/2/2001	Portland		Earle A. Chiles Center-Portland, OR	L 79–78	4–2
12/10/2001	Minnesota		Williams Arena-Minneapolis, MN	L 75–72	4–3
12/14/2001	Pepperdine		McArthur Court-Eugene, OR	W 88–64	5–3
12/16/2001	Northern Arizona		McArthur Court-Eugene, OR	W 86–51	6–3
12/20/2001	Arizona State		McArthur Court-Eugene, OR	W 103–90	7–3
12/22/2001	#11 Arizona		McArthur Court-Eugene, OR	W 105–75	8–3
12/27/2001	Morris Brown		McArthur Court-Eugene, OR	W 96–50	9–3
1/4/2002	#15 Arizona		McKale Center-Tucson, AZ	W 90–80	10–3
1/6/2002	Arizona State		Wells Fargo Arena-Tempe, AZ	L 95–88	10–4
1/10/2002	California		McArthur Court-Eugene, OR	W 76–72	11–4
1/12/2002	#14Stanford		McArthur Court-Eugene, OR	W 87–79	12–4
1/15/2002	Willamette	# 23	McArthur Court-Eugene, OR	W 71–48	13–4
1/19/2002	Oregon State	# 23	Gill Coliseum-Corvallis, OR	W 63–51	14–4
1/24/2002	Washington	# 19	Alaska Airlines Arena-Seattle, WA	L 97–92	14–5
1/26/2002	Washington State	# 19	Wallis Beasley Performing Arts Coliseum-Pullman, WA	W 94–86	15–5
1/31/2002	# 13 UCLA		McArthur Court-Eugene, OR	W 91–62	16–5
2/2/2002	# 23 USC		McArthur Court-Eugene, OR	W 73–69	17–5
2/7/2002	# 20 Stanford	# 13	Maples Pavilion-Stanford, CA	L 90–87(OT)	17–6
2/9/2002	California	# 13	Haas Pavilion-Berkeley,CA	L 107–103 (2OT)	17–7
2/16/2002	Oregon State	# 17	McArthur Court-Eugene, OR	W 91–62	18–7
2/21/2002	Washington State	# 15	McArthur Court-Eugene, OR	W 115–77	19–7
2/23/2002	Washington	# 15	McArthur Court-Eugene, OR	W 90–84	20–7
2/28/2002	# 19 USC	# 13	Los Angeles Sports Arena-Los Angeles, CA	W 67–65	21–7
3/2/2002	UCLA	# 13	Pauley Pavilion-Los Angeles, CA	W 65–62	22–7
3/7/2002	Washington	# 9	Staples Center-Los Angeles, CA	W 86–64	23–7
3/8/2002	#22 USC	# 9	Staples Center-Los Angeles, CA	L 89–78	23–8
3/14/2002	vs.(15 MW) Montana	#11 (2 MW)	Power Balance Pavilion-Sacramento, CA (first round)	W 81–62	24–8
3/16/2002	vs.(7 MW) Wake Forest	#11 (2 MW)	Power Balance Pavilion-Sacramento, CA (second round)	W 92–87	25–8
3/22/2002	vs.(6 MW) Texas	#11 (2 MW)	Kohl Center-Madison, WI (Sweet 16)	W 72–70	26–8
3/24/2002	vs.(1 MW) #1 Kansas	#11 (2 MW)	Kohl Center-Madison, WI (Elite 8)	L 104–86	26–9

== NBA draft ==
Round	Pick	Player	NBA club
1	14	Fred Jones	Indiana Pacers
