= Cedric Bozeman =

American basketball player (born 1983)

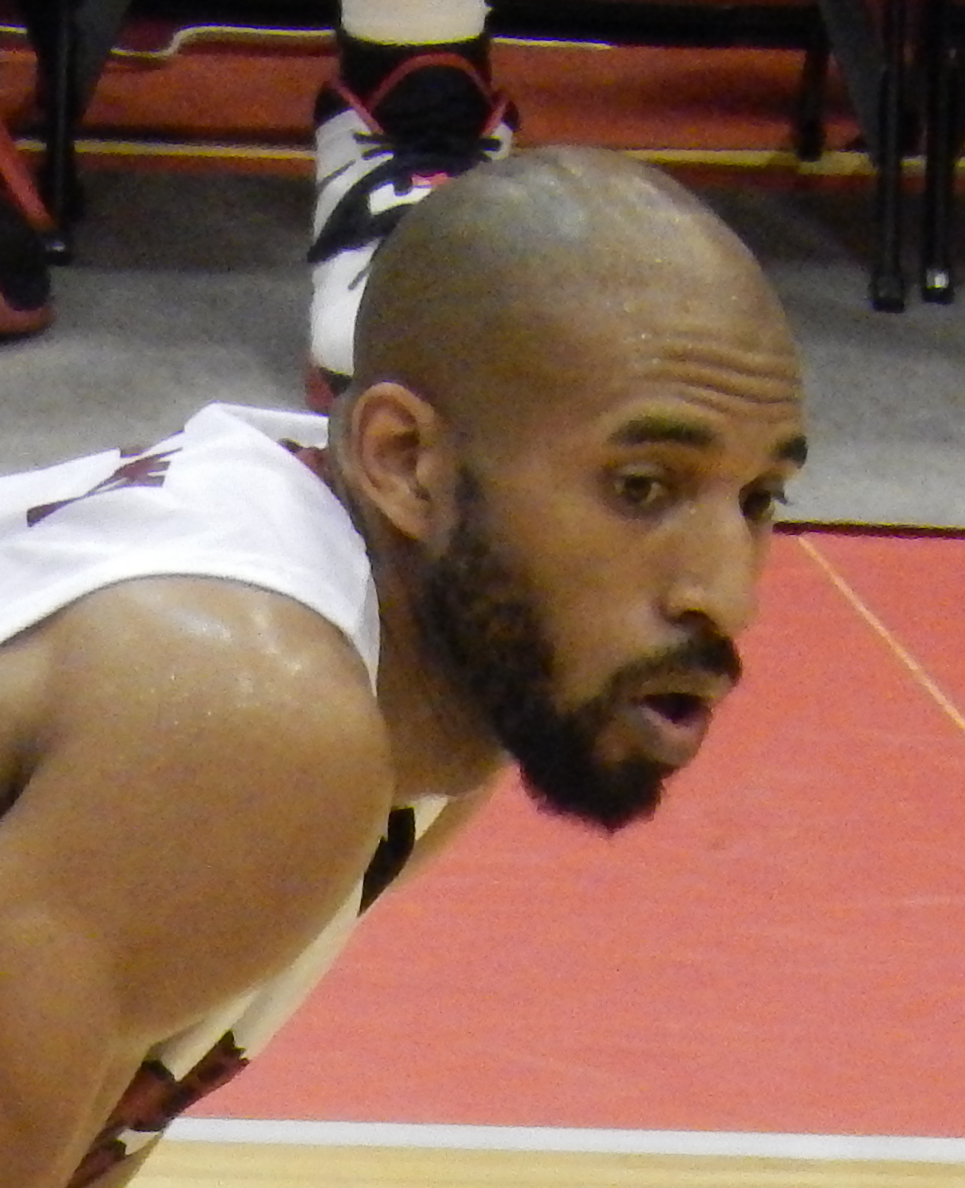
- Bozeman in 2013

Personal information
- Born: March 7, 1983 (age 43) Los Angeles, California, U.S.
- Listed height: 6 ft 6 in (1.98 m)
- Listed weight: 215 lb (98 kg)

Career information
- High school: Mater Dei (Santa Ana, California)
- College: UCLA (2002–2006)
- NBA draft: 2006: undrafted
- Playing career: 2006–2018
- Position: Shooting guard / small forward
- Number: 6

Career history
- 2006–2007: Atlanta Hawks
- 2007: Albuquerque Thunderbirds
- 2007: Telindus Oostende
- 2007–2008: Energa Czarni Słupsk
- 2008–2009: Anaheim Arsenal
- 2009–2010: Beijing Ducks
- 2010–2011: Belgacom Liège
- 2011–2012: Reno Bighorns
- 2012: Maine Red Claws
- 2012: Barangay Ginebra Kings
- 2013: Westports Malaysia Dragons
- 2013–2015: Toshiba Brave Thunders Kanagawa
- 2016–2017: Fukushima Firebonds
- 2017–2018: Link Tochigi Brex

Career highlights
- McDonald's All-American (2001); Second-team Parade All-American (2001)
- Stats at NBA.com
- Stats at Basketball Reference

Cedric Rudolph Bozeman (born March 7, 1983) is an American former professional basketball player.

== Early life ==
Born in Los Angeles, California, Bozeman attended Mater Dei High School in Santa Ana alongside Jamal Sampson and USC Heisman Trophy winner, Matt Leinart. He was a member of the high school's top-ranked Mater Dei Monarchs basketball team. Bozeman later played college basketball with the UCLA Bruins.

During his freshman year, he played in 26 games (21 starts) and was an Honorable-Mention Pac-10 All-Freshman Team Selection after averaging 3.5 assists per game (8th In Pac-10). At the UCLA Basketball Banquet Awards he won the Seymour Armond Memorial Award as the most valuable freshman. As a junior, he started all 28 games, and led the Pac-10 in assists per game (5.5) and assists (155). At the end of the year banquet, he was given the Bruin Hoopsters JD Morgan memorial award for outstanding team play.

== Professional career ==
Bozeman was not drafted in the NBA, but found his way into the league through the Atlanta Hawks where he averaged 1.1 points in 23 games with five starts before being waived in January 2007. Soon thereafter he was quickly picked up by the Albuquerque Thunderbirds of the NBA D-League. Bozeman went overseas to play for the Belgium-based Telindus Oostende basketball club and averaged 4.6 points per game over ten games. The former Bruin went on to play another season in Europe, this time with the Polish Czarni Słupsk club during the 2007–08 season.

In 2010, he signed with Belgacom Liège in Belgium.

For the 2011–12 season, Bozeman joined the Reno Bighorns of the NBDL. At the end of December 2011, the Bighorns waived Bozeman due to injury. However, he later rejoined the team. In 2012, he joined the Barangay Ginebra Kings of Philippine Basketball Association as their import for the Governors Cup. Later in 2012, he signed with the Westports Malaysia Dragons.

From 2013 to 2015, Bozeman played with the Toshiba Brave Thunders Kanagawa of the Japanese NBL where he won a championship in the 2013–14 season.

== Career statistics ==
Legend
GP	Games played	GS	Games started	MPG	Minutes per game
FG%	Field goal percentage	3P%	3-point field goal percentage	FT%	Free throw percentage
RPG	Rebounds per game	APG	Assists per game	SPG	Steals per game
BPG	Blocks per game	PPG	Points per game	**Bold**	Career high

=== NBA ===
Year	Team	GP	GS	MPG	FG%	3P%	FT%	RPG	APG	SPG	BPG	PPG
2006–07	Atlanta	23	5	8.7	.282	.154	.333	1.0	0.4	0.2	0.1	1.1

=== College ===
Year	Team	GP	GS	MPG	FG%	3P%	FT%	RPG	APG	SPG	BPG	PPG
2001–02	UCLA	26	21	23.4	.413	.280	.286	2.5	3.5	0.2	**0.1**	4.0
2002–03	UCLA	21	17	26.0	.408	.313	.514	3.0	3.2	0.8	0.0	7.3
2003–04	UCLA	28	28	**33.7**	.413	.222	.554	**3.8**	**5.5**	0.6	**0.1**	7.5
2005–06	UCLA	**31**	**30**	27.4	**.500**	**.393**	**.776**	3.3	2.3	**0.9**	**0.1**	**7.6**
Career		106	96	27.8	.435	.321	.584	3.2	3.6	0.6	0.1	6.6
