= Billy Knight (basketball, born 1979) =

American basketball player (1979–2018)

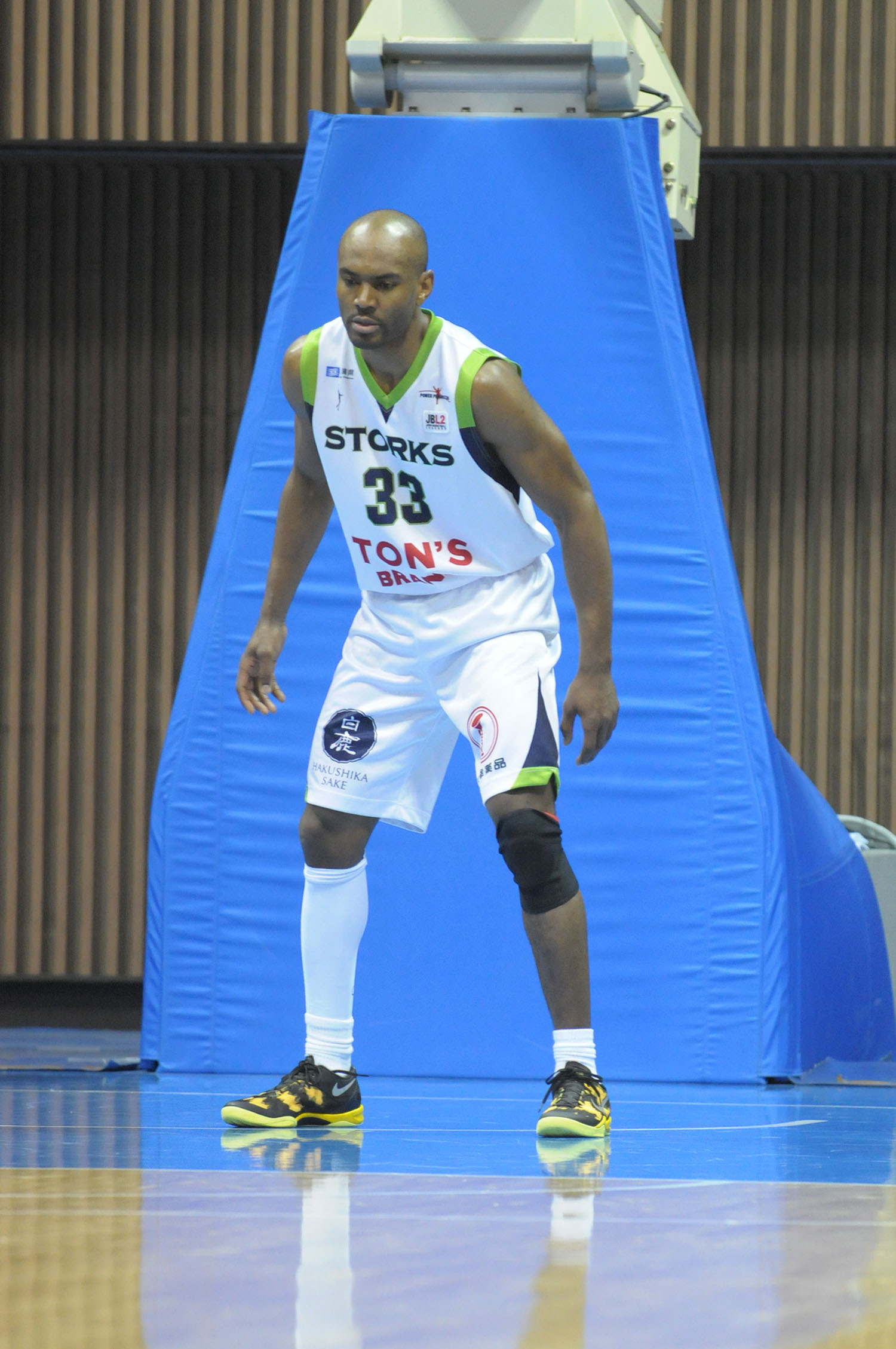

Personal information
- Born: January 20, 1979 Los Angeles, California, U.S.
- Died: July 8, 2018 (aged 39) Phoenix, Arizona, U.S.
- Listed height: 6 ft 6 in (1.98 m)
- Listed weight: 209 lb (95 kg)

Career information
- High school: Westchester (Los Angeles, California)
- College: UCLA (1997–2002）
- NBA draft: 2002: undrafted
- Playing career: 2002–2016
- Position: Shooting guard

Career history
- 2002–2003: Akropol BBK
- 2003–2004: Entente Orléanaise 45
- 2004–2005: Apollon Limassol
- 2005: JA Vichy
- 2005: Trotamundos B.B.C.
- 2005–2006: Al Rayyan
- 2006: Hollywood Fame
- 2006–2007: Santa Barbara Breakers
- 2007–2008: ESSM Le Portel
- ?: Los Angeles Lightning
- 2008–2009: Boulazac Basket Dordogne
- 2009–2010: Hamamatsu Higashimikawa Phoenix
- 2010–2011: Osaka Evessa
- 2011–2015: Hyogo Storks
- 2015–2016: Yamagata Wyverns

Career highlights
- bj league champion (2010); 2× bj league All-Star; JBL2 champion (2013); JBL2 Scoring leader (2012); JBL2 Block leader (2012); 2x JBL2 Best Five (2012, 2013)

William Price Knight (January 20, 1979 – July 8, 2018) was an American professional basketball player. He played college basketball for the UCLA Bruins. His last professional stops were in Japan with Hamamatsu, Osaka, Hyogo and Yamagata.

== Early life ==
He attended high school at Westchester High in Los Angeles. As a sophomore, he was a reserve at center when Knight's father decided that his son's chances for an athletic scholarship to college rested on his jump-shooting skills. Knight was already tall, so his father set up dummies in their backyard court that he would be forced to shoot over. As a senior, he had developed into one of the top jump shooters nationally and committed to play college basketball for the UCLA Bruins.

== Professional career ==
Knight helped the Hamamatsu Higashimikawa Phoenix to their first bj league title in 2009–2010, when he was the league's third-leading scorer, averaging 19.6 points per game. He and teammate Wendell White formed a duo dubbed the "White–Knight Show". In 2012–13, he helped lead the Hyogo Storks to their first Japan Basketball League (JBL2) championship.

== Criminal allegations and death ==
On June 13, 2018, Knight was arrested on six counts of molestation charges, including two counts of sexual conduct with a minor. He died by suicide through multiple blunt force injuries on July 8 after jumping from a building in Phoenix, Arizona, shortly after posting a video to YouTube talking about his mental illness and encouraging others to seek help.

== Career statistics ==
=== Professional ===
Legend
GP	Games played	GS	Games started	MPG	Minutes per game
FG%	Field goal percentage	3P%	3-point field goal percentage	FT%	Free throw percentage
RPG	Rebounds per game	APG	Assists per game	SPG	Steals per game
BPG	Blocks per game	PPG	Points per game	**Bold**	Career high

†	Denotes seasons in which Knight won a league championship

==== Regular season ====
Year	Team	GP	GS	MPG	FG%	3P%	FT%	RPG	APG	SPG	BPG	PPG
2003–04	Orléans	9		29.3	.450	.447	.722	5.3	2.0	1.3	0.0	17.7
2003–04	Akropol	30		30.1	.539	.500	.836	7.4	2.1	1.4	0.1	28.9
2005–06	Vichy	12		30.4	.401	.275	.773	5.6	1.5	1.9	0.3	15.7
2007–08	Portel	31		26.6	.499	.369	.764	3.0	1.7	2.3	0.1	16.0
2008–09	Boulazac	19		26.8	.534	.439	.775	4.3	1.8	1.2	0.0	14.9
2009–10†	Hamamatsu	47	29	26.2	.413	.395	.795	5.4	2.0	1.3	0.3	19.6
2010–11	Osaka	50	37	25.0	.457	.357	.797	7.3	2.0	1.3	0.3	17.1
2013–14	Hyogo	54	53	26.6	.385	.367	.843	6.8	1.1	1.4	0.3	17.6
2014–15	Hyogo	54		16.9	.420	.284	.836	3.6	0.7	0.9	0.2	13.1
2015–16	Yamagata	36	9	21.9	.470	.392	.847	8.9	1.2	1.1	0.6	21.1

==== Playoffs ====
Year	Team	GP	GS	MPG	FG%	3P%	FT%	RPG	APG	SPG	BPG	PPG
2010–11	Osaka	4		26.5	.421	.000	.783	8.0	3.0	1.3	0.0	16.5

=== College ===
Year	Team	GP	GS	MPG	FG%	3P%	FT%	RPG	APG	SPG	BPG	PPG
1997–98	UCLA	24	1	6.0	.444	.387	.727	0.9	0.1	0.2	0.0	2.8
1998–99	UCLA	Redshirt										
1999–2000	UCLA	28	9	11.2	.453	.397	.656	2.1	0.7	0.5	0.0	5.4
2000–01	UCLA	32	18	17.6	.460	.421	.732	1.9	0.6	0.6	0.1	7.9
2001–02	UCLA	33	33	29.0	.458	.397	.826	3.5	1.4	1.2	0.1	14.1
Career		117	61	16.9	.456	.403	.774	2.2	0.7	0.7	0.1	8.0
