= 2001–02 Arizona Wildcats men's basketball team =

American college basketball season

2001–02 Arizona Wildcats men's basketball

Pac-10 tournament champion

NCAA tournament, Sweet Sixteen
- Conference: Pacific-10 Conference

Ranking
- Coaches: No. 10
- AP: No. 7
- Record: 24–10 (12–6 Pac-10)
- Head coach: Lute Olson (19th season)
- Assistant coaches: Jim Rosborough; Rodney Tention; Jay John
- Home arena: McKale Center

2001–02 Pacific-10 Conference men's basketball standings
	Conf.				Overall
Team	W		L	PCT	W		L	PCT
No. 6 Oregon	14	–	4	.778	26	–	9	.743
California	12	–	6	.667	23	–	9	.719
No. 10 Arizona†	12	–	6	.667	24	–	10	.706
No. 18 USC	12	–	6	.667	22	–	10	.688
Stanford	12	–	6	.667	20	–	10	.667
No. 20 UCLA	11	–	7	.611	21	–	12	.636
Arizona State	7	–	11	.389	12	–	15	.444
Washington	5	–	13	.278	11	–	17	.393
Oregon State	4	–	14	.222	11	–	17	.393
Washington State	1	–	17	.056	6	–	21	.222
† Conference tournament winner As of July 10, 2011; Rankings from Coaches Poll

The 2001–02 Arizona Wildcats men's basketball team represented the University of Arizona. The head coach was Lute Olson. The team played its home games in the McKale Center in Tucson, Arizona, and was a member of the Pacific-10 Conference. In the Pac-10 Basketball Tournament, Arizona beat USC by a score of 81–71 to claim its fourth Pac-10 title.

== Roster ==
2001–02 Arizona Wildcats men's basketball team
Players
Coaches

Pos.	#	Name	Height	Weight	Year	Hometown
G	3	Will Bynum	5 ft 10 in (1.78 m)	183 lb (83 kg)	Fr	Chicago, Illinois
F	4	Luke Walton	6 ft 8 in (2.03 m)	241 lb (109 kg)	Jr	San Diego, California
G	10	Anas Fellah (W)	5 ft 10 in (1.78 m)	165 lb (75 kg)	Fr	Tucson, Arizona
G	11	Jason Ranne	6 ft 4 in (1.93 m)	204 lb (93 kg)	So	Tulsa, Oklahoma
G	12	Fil Torres (W)	6 ft 2 in (1.88 m)	185 lb (84 kg)	Jr	Lisle, Illinois
F	13	Andrew Zahn	6 ft 9 in (2.06 m)	254 lb (115 kg)	RS Fr	Redondo Beach, California
F	14	Peter Hansen	6 ft 8 in (2.03 m)	241 lb (109 kg)	Sr	Palo Alto, California
G	20	Salim Stoudamire	6 ft 1 in (1.85 m)	176 lb (80 kg)	Fr	Portland, Oregon
F	21	Mike Schwertley	6 ft 5 in (1.96 m)	229 lb (104 kg)	So	Phoenix, Arizona
G	22	Jason Gardner	5 ft 10 in (1.78 m)	181 lb (82 kg)	Jr	Indianapolis, Indiana
F	33	Rick Anderson	6 ft 9 in (2.06 m)	213 lb (97 kg)	Jr	Long Beach, California
F	34	Dennis Latimore	6 ft 8 in (2.03 m)	254 lb (115 kg)	Fr	Halstead, Kansas
C	45	Channing Frye	6 ft 10 in (2.08 m)	222 lb (101 kg)	Fr	Phoenix, Arizona
C	52	Isaiah Fox	6 ft 9 in (2.06 m)	265 lb (120 kg)	Fr	Santa Monica, California

Head coach

- Lute Olsen

Assistant coach(es)

- Jim Rosborough
- Rodney Tention
- Jay John

Legend

- (C) Team captain
- (S) Suspended
- (I) Ineligible
- (W) Walk-on
- Injured
- Current redshirt

Roster

=== Depth chart ===
Pos.	Starting 5	Bench 1	Bench 2
C	Channing Frye	Isaiah Fox	Andrew Zahn
PF	Luke Walton	Dennis Latimore	Peter Hansen
SF	Rick Anderson		Mike Schwertley
SG	Salim Stoudamire		Jason Ranne
PG	Jason Gardner	Will Bynum	Fil Torres

== Schedule ==
Date time, TV	Rank^{#}	Opponent^{#}	Result	Record	Site (attendance) city, state
Regular season
Nov. 8, 2001*; 7:00 PM, ESPN2		vs. No. 2 Maryland; Coaches vs Cancer IKON Classic	W 71–67	1–0	Madison Square Garden (12,615); New York City, New York
Nov. 9, 2001*; 7:00 PM, ESPN		vs. No. 6 Florida; Coaches vs. Cancer IKON Classic	W 75–71	2–0	Madison Square Garden (15,404); New York City, New York
Nov. 17, 2001*; 7:00 PM		at No. 23 Texas	W 88–74	3–0	Frank Erwin Center (15,291); Austin, Texas
Dec. 1, 2001*; 12:30 PM, CBS	No. 4	No. 8 Kansas	L 97–105	3–1	McKale Center (14,562); Tucson, Arizona
Dec. 4, 2001*; 6:00 PM	No. 7	vs. No. 5 Illinois; Southwest Showdown	W 87–82	4–1	America West Arena (10,697); Phoenix, Arizona
Dec. 8, 2001*; 1:30 PM	No. 7	vs. Purdue; Wooden Classic	W 79–66	5–1	Arrowhead Pond of Anaheim (16,221); Anaheim, California
Dec. 15, 2001*; 12:00 PM	No. 6	at No. 23 Michigan State	L 60–74	5–2	Breslin Center (14,759); East Lansing, Michigan
Dec. 20, 2001; 6:00 PM	No. 11	at Oregon State	W 76–73	6–2 (1–0)	Gill Coliseum (7,767); Corvallis, Oregon
Dec. 22, 2001; 5:00 PM	No. 11	at Oregon	L 75–105	6–3 (1–1)	McArthur Court (9,087); Eugene, Oregon
Dec. 28, 2001*; 6:00 PM	No. 14	Pepperdine; Fiesta Bowl Classic	W 94–71	7–3	McKale Center (14,566); Tucson, Arizona
Dec. 30, 2001*; 2:00 PM	No. 14	Valparaiso; Fiesta Bowl Classic	W 74–70	8–3	McKale Center (14,515); Tucson, Arizona
Jan. 4, 2002; 6:30 PM	No. 15	Oregon	L 80–90	8–4 (1–2)	McKale Center (14,562); Tucson, Arizona
Jan. 6, 2002; 7:00 PM	No. 15	Oregon State	W 93–87	9–4 (2–2)	McKale Center (14,242); Tucson, Arizona
Jan. 10, 2002; 6:00 PM	No. 20	at Washington State	W 92–85	10–4 (3–2)	Beasley Coliseum (2,459); Pullman, Washington
Jan. 12, 2002; 6:00 PM	No. 20	at Washington	W 74–69	11–4 (4–2)	Bank of America Arena (8,260); Seattle, Washington
Jan. 17, 2002; 8:30 PM	No. 15	No. 18 USC	W 97–80	12–4 (5–2)	McKale Center (14,574); Tucson, Arizona
Jan. 19, 2002; 12:00 PM, CBS	No. 15	No. 9 UCLA; Rivalry	W 96–86	13–4 (6–2)	McKale Center (14,571); Tucson, Arizona
Jan. 23, 2002; 8:30 PM	No. 10	at Arizona State; Rivalry	L 72–88	13–5 (6–3)	Wells Fargo Arena (13,581); Tempe, Arizona
Jan. 26, 2002*; 11:00 AM, CBS	No. 10	No. 25 Connecticut	L 98–100 ^{OT}	13–6	McKale Center (14,577); Tucson, Arizona
Jan. 31, 2002; 6:00 PM	No. 19	at California	W 68–58	14–6 (7–3)	Haas Pavilion (12,000); Berkeley, California
Feb. 2, 2002; 4:00 PM	No. 19	at No. 18 Stanford	W 88–82 ^{OT}	15–6 (8–3)	Maples Pavilion (7,391); Palo Alto, California
Feb. 7, 2002; 6:30 PM	No. 11	Washington	W 91–82	16–6 (9–3)	McKale Center (14,572); Tucson, Arizona
Feb. 9, 2002; 8:00 PM	No. 11	Washington State	W 85–68	17–6 (10–3)	McKale Center (14,580); Tucson, Arizona
Feb. 14, 2002; 6:30 PM	No. 9	at No. 20 UCLA; Rivalry	L 76–77	17–7 (10–4)	Pauley Pavilion (11,960); Los Angeles, California
Feb. 16, 2002; 4:00 PM	No. 9	at No. 25 USC	L 89–94	17–8 (10–5)	LA Memorial Sports Arena (12,573); Los Angeles, California
Feb. 20, 2002; 3:00 PM	No. 14	Arizona State; Rivalry	W 83–75	18–8 (11–5)	McKale Center (14,585); Tucson, Arizona
Feb. 28, 2002; 8:30 PM	No. 14	No. 17 Stanford	L 71–76	18–9 (11–6)	McKale Center (14,586); Tucson, Arizona
Mar. 2, 2002; 8:30 PM	No. 14	No. 21 California	W 90–78	19–9 (12–6)	McKale Center (14,578); Tucson, Arizona
Pac-10 tournament
Mar. 7, 2002; 6:45 PM	(2) No. 15	vs. (7) Arizona State; Quarterfinals	W 73–56	20–9	Staples Center (12,096); Los Angeles, California
Mar. 8, 2002; 8:30 PM	(2) No. 15	vs. (3) No. 25 California; Semifinals	W 90–78	21–9	Staples Center (18,887); Los Angeles, California
Mar. 9, 2002; 3:00 PM, CBS	(2) No. 15	vs. (4) No. 22 USC; Championship	W 81–71	22–9	Staples Center (18,997); Los Angeles, California
NCAA tournament
Mar. 14, 2002*; 8:10 PM, CBS	(3 W) No. 7	vs. (14 W) UC Santa Barbara; First round	W 86–81	23–9	The Pit (15,626); Albuquerque, New Mexico
Mar. 16, 2002*; 3:50 PM, CBS	(3 W) No. 7	vs. (11 W) Wyoming; Second round	W 68–60	24–9	The Pit (15,867); Albuquerque, New Mexico
Mar. 21, 2002*; 5:55 PM, CBS	(3 W) No. 7	vs. (2 W) No. 3 Oklahoma; Sweet Sixteen	L 67–88	24–10	Compaq Center (18,040); San Jose, California
*Non-conference game. ^{#}Rankings from AP Poll. (#) Tournament seedings in parentheses. W=West Region. All times are in Mountain Time.

== Awards and honors ==
- Lute Olson, Enshrined in Basketball Hall of Fame on June 5, 2002
- Salim Stoudamire, Pac-10 Freshman of the Year
- Luke Walton, Pacific-10 Tournament Most Outstanding Player
