= T. J. Cummings =

American basketball player (born 1981)

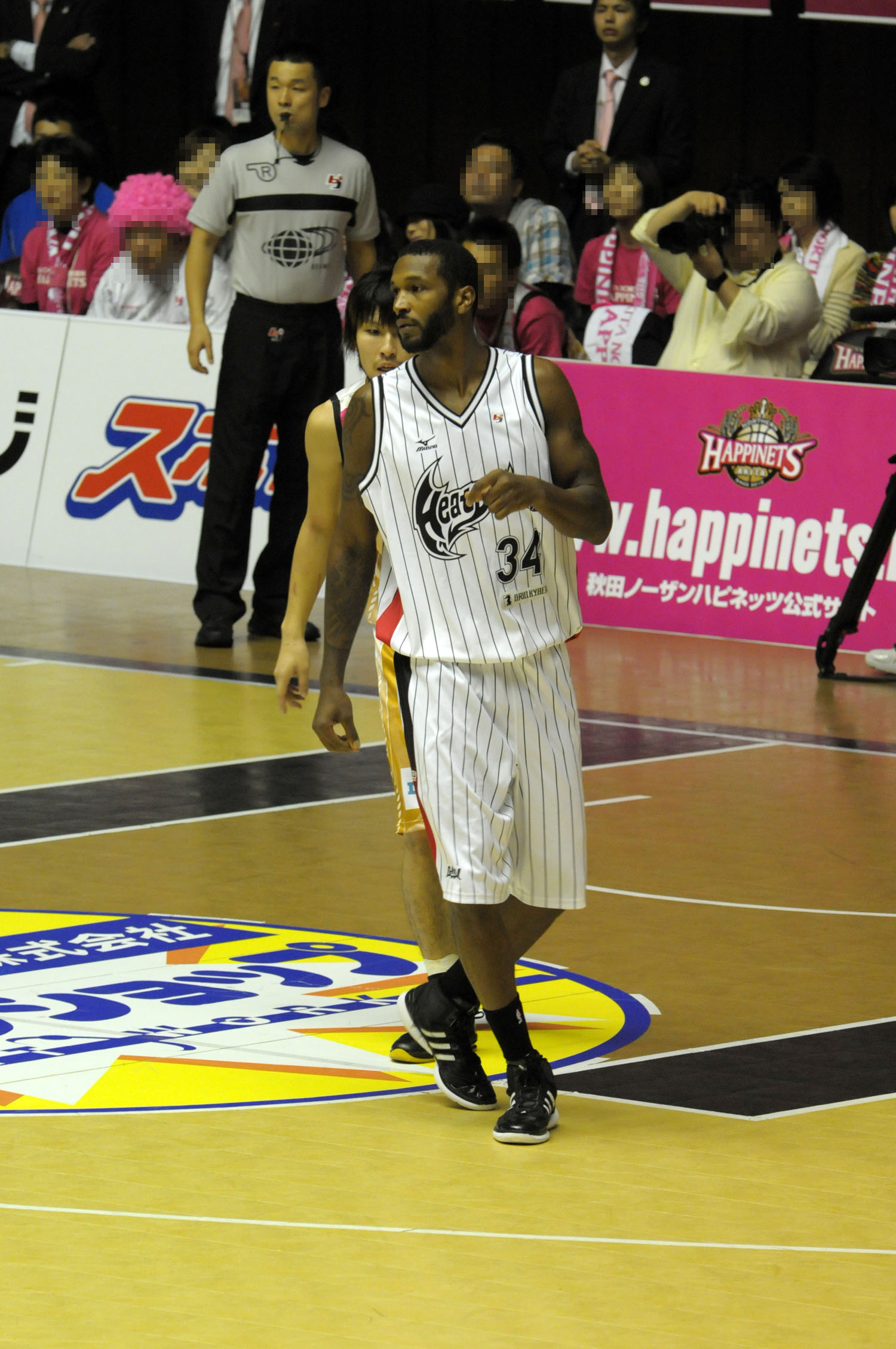

Personal information
- Born: August 31, 1981 (age 44) Homewood, Illinois, U.S.
- Listed height: 6 ft 10 in (2.08 m)
- Listed weight: 223 lb (101 kg)

Career information
- High school: Homewood-Flossmoor (Flossmoor, Illinois)
- College: UCLA (2000–2004)
- NBA draft: 2004: undrafted
- Playing career: 2004–2015
- Position: Power forward / small forward

Career history
- 2004–2005: Liaoning Hunters
- 2005–2006: Albuquerque Thunderbirds
- 2007: Los Angeles D-Fenders
- 2007: Maratonistas de Coamo
- 2007–2008: Anyang KGC
- 2008: Anaheim Arsenal
- 2009: Liège Basket
- 2009–2010: Springfield Armor
- 2010: Maine Red Claws
- 2010–2011: Changwon LG Sakers
- 2011–2012: Oita Heat Devils
- 2012: Akita Northern Happinets
- 2012–2013: Sendai 89ERS
- 2013–2014: Shimane Susanoo Magic
- 2014–2015: Club Atlético Goes
- 2015: Mono Thew

Robert Tyrell "T. J" Cummings Jr. (born August 31, 1981) is an American former basketball player. He is the son of former NBA player Terry Cummings and graduate of Homewood-Flossmoor High School. Cummings played college basketball with the UCLA Bruins for four years. Upon graduation, he was drafted in the 2005 NBDL draft by the Albuquerque Thunderbirds in the 3rd round. In his rookie year, he averaged 12.6 points per game and 6.4 rebounds per game. On April 22, Albuquerque won the NBDL Championship against the Fort Worth Flyers 119–108.

In the 2006–2007 season, Cummings was waived by the Thunderbirds, but was signed by the Los Angeles D-Fenders.

== High School Special Event Stats ==
Year	Team	GP	GS	MPG	FG%	3P%	FT%	RPG	APG	SPG	BPG	PPG
2000	Nike Hoop Summit	1		4.00	1.000	.000	.000	1.00	0.00	0.00	0.00	1.00

== College statistics ==
Year	Team	GP	GS	MPG	FG%	3P%	FT%	RPG	APG	SPG	BPG	PPG
2000–01	UCLA	32	6	18.8	.485	.000	.652	3.5	0.4	0.2	0.4	6.4
2001–02	UCLA	33	1	17.5	.510	.250	.745	3.1	0.5	0.2	0.2	7.6
2002–03	UCLA	29	16	23.4	.455	.111	.812	4.9	0.7	0.3	0.4	10.3
2003–04	UCLA	24	22	29.7	.552	.350	.863	6.7	1.2	0.1	0.2	12.8
Career		118	46	22.9	.500	.250	.766	4.4	0.7	0.2	0.3	9.0

=== NCAA Awards & Honors ===
- Pac-12 All-Freshman Team – 2001

== Career statistics ==
Legend
GP	Games played	GS	Games started	MPG	Minutes per game
FG%	Field goal percentage	3P%	3-point field goal percentage	FT%	Free throw percentage
RPG	Rebounds per game	APG	Assists per game	SPG	Steals per game
BPG	Blocks per game	PPG	Points per game	**Bold**	Career high

Year	Team	GP	GS	MPG	FG%	3P%	FT%	RPG	APG	SPG	BPG	PPG
2008–09	Anaheim	3	3	24.4	.417	.000	1.000	3.33	0.00	1.33	0.00	10.00
2008–09	Liege	5		13.8	.333	.500	.750	2.2	0.2	0.0	0.0	4.8
2009–10	Springf/Maine	39	23	27.0	.464	.000	.708	6.64	0.97	0.36	0.31	11.62
2010–11	Changwon	47		10.9	.529	.000	.755	3.0	0.2	0.4	0.3	6.3
2011–12	Oita	52	52	31.6	.485	.190	.707	9.7	1.3	0.9	0.7	21.1
2012–13	Akita	12		28.9	.412	.000	.721	7.7	1.7	0.7	0.4	19.3
2012–13	Sendai	36		33.5	.464	.250	.685	8.3	1.7	0.5	0.2	23.1
2013–14	Shimane	32		27.6	.463	.125	.659	6.6	1.0	0.5	0.5	14.0
