= 2002 Pacific-10 Conference men's basketball tournament =

- Classification: Division I
- Season: 2001–02
- Teams: 8
- Site: Staples Center; Los Angeles, California
- Champions: Arizona (4th title)
- Winning coach: Lute Olsen (4th title)
- MVP: Luke Walton (Arizona)
- Attendance: 18,997 (final game)

2001–02 Pacific-10 Conference men's basketball standings
	Conf.				Overall
Team	W		L	PCT	W		L	PCT
No. 6 Oregon	14	–	4	.778	26	–	9	.743
California	12	–	6	.667	23	–	9	.719
No. 10 Arizona†	12	–	6	.667	24	–	10	.706
No. 18 USC	12	–	6	.667	22	–	10	.688
Stanford	12	–	6	.667	20	–	10	.667
No. 20 UCLA	11	–	7	.611	21	–	12	.636
Arizona State	7	–	11	.389	12	–	15	.444
Washington	5	–	13	.278	11	–	17	.393
Oregon State	4	–	14	.222	11	–	17	.393
Washington State	1	–	17	.056	6	–	21	.222
† Conference tournament winner As of July 10, 2011; Rankings from Coaches Poll

The 2002 Pacific-10 Conference men's basketball tournament was played March 7–9 at Staples Center in Los Angeles, California. The event was revived after eleven seasons without, and USC made its first appearance in the final. The champion of the tournament was Arizona, which received the Pac-10's automatic bid to the NCAA tournament. The Most Outstanding Player was Luke Walton of Arizona, and a capacity crowd of 18,997 attended the championship game on Saturday.

== Seeds ==
The top eight teams participated, with all in the Thursday quarterfinals. Teams were seeded by conference record, with a tiebreaker system used to seed teams with identical conference records. The previous four editions (1987–1990) included all ten teams, with the final on Sunday.

== Bracket ==
Quarterfinals; Thursday, March 7
1	#9 Oregon	86
8	Washington	64
4	#22 USC	103
5	#16 Stanford	78
3	#25 California	67
6	UCLA	61
2	#15 Arizona	73
7	Arizona State	56

Semifinals; Friday, March 8
1	#9 Oregon	78
4	#22 USC	89
3	#25 California	78
2	#15 Arizona	90

Final; Saturday, March 9
4	#22 USC	71
2	#15 Arizona	81

== Tournament Notes ==
- Arch-rivals Arizona and ASU met for the first time in a Pac-10 Tournament (the 2nd meeting ever by any arch-rival universities).
- Only one lower seeded team beat a higher seeded team the whole tournament (#4 USC over #1 Oregon in the second round).
- In this tournament Oregon set the team single game record for the most blocked shots with 9 (vs. Washington).
- This was the first Pac-10 Basketball Tournament held in the 21st century.

== All tournament team ==
- Luke Walton, Arizona – Tournament MVP
- Sam Clancy, USC
- Brandon Granville, USC
- Jason Gardner, Arizona
- Salim Stoudamire, Arizona
