= Jim Saia =

American basketball coach

Current position
- Conference: CCAA

Biographical details
- Born: June 15, 1964 (age 62); San Francisco, California, U.S.

Playing career
- 1982–1984: Cal Poly
- 1984–1985: College of Marin
- 1985–1987: Chapman

Coaching career (HC unless noted)
- 1988–1989: California (asst.)
- 1989–1990: Indiana State (asst.)
- 1990–1994: Fresno State (asst.)
- 1994–1996: Columbia JC
- 1996–2003: UCLA (asst.)
- 2004–2005: USC (asst./interim HC)
- 2006–2007: Citrus CC (asst.)
- 2007–2010: Fresno Pacific
- 2010: Los Angeles Sparks (asst.)
- 2010–2016: Cal State San Marcos
- 2016–2026: Cal State Los Angeles

Head coaching record
- Overall: 275–172 (college); 61–10 (junior college)

James Sebastian Saia (born June 15, 1964) is an American men's basketball player and coach. Saia was most recently the men's head basketball coach at California State University, Los Angeles.

== High school career ==
Born in San Francisco, Saia prepped at Sir Francis Drake High in San Anselmo, California and graduated in 1982. He was a member of the basketball team that won the 1982 California state championship with a 34–0 record. There, he was teammates with future UCLA coach Steve Lavin.

== College career ==
Saia started his college basketball playing career at Cal Poly in the 1983–84 season, after redshirting a year. That season, he averaged 1.2 points and 0.4 rebounds in 19 games. He then transferred to College of Marin for the 1984–85 season and finished at Chapman University for his final two years, where he would join his childhood friend Steve Lavin. Saia graduated from Chapman in 1987.

== Coaching career ==
Saia began his coaching career as an assistant under Lou Campanelli at California in the 1988–89 season then was an assistant at Indiana State in the 1989–90 season and Fresno State from 1990 to 1994.

From 1994 to 1996, Saia was head coach at Columbia College, a junior college in Sonora, California. He led Columbia to a 61–10 cumulative record, two Central Valley Conference titles, and an appearance in the Final Eight round of the 1996 CCCAA tournament.

Saia then returned to the Division I level as an assistant at UCLA under Steve Lavin, a position for which Saia stayed from 1996 until 2003, after Lavin was fired. At UCLA, Saia coached future NBA players like Baron Davis, Earl Watson, Jason Kapono, and Matt Barnes.

Originally an assistant in the 2004–05 season, Saia took over as interim head coach at USC after the firing of Henry Bibby in December. USC went 10–15 for the rest of the season under Saia.

Saia returned to the junior college ranks as an assistant coach at Citrus in the 2006-07 season. From 2007 to 2010, Saia was head coach at Fresno Pacific, an NAIA school at the time. At Fresno Pacific, Saia had a 70–29 overall record with two NAIA Tournament appearances.

Saia was an assistant coach for the Los Angeles Sparks during the 2010 season.

On May 25, 2010, Cal State San Marcos hired Saia as its inaugural men's basketball head coach. The program's first season was in 2011–12, in which Cal State San Marcos competed in the NAIA level and advanced to the Association of Independent Institutions (AII) title game. In the 2012-13 season, Saia led Cal State San Marcos to its first appearance in the NAIA Tournament. Cal State San Marcos later had two straight seasons with 30 or more wins in 2013–14 and 2014–15, and Saia won AII Coach of the Year honors both seasons. Saia coached at Cal State San Marcos through the 2015–16 season, its first in the NCAA Division II level and California Collegiate Athletic Association and in which the team finished 15–12.

Cal State Los Angeles hired Saia as head coach on June 6, 2016.

== Head coaching record ==
=== Junior college ===
Record table
Season	Team	Overall	Conference	Standing	Postseason
Columbia Claim Jumpers (Central Valley Conference) (1994–1995)
1994–95	Columbia (CA)	31–5	?	1st	CCCAA Tournament
1995–96	Columbia (CA)	30–5	?	1st	CCCAA Final Eight
Columbia (CA):		61–10 (.859)	25–3(.893)		
Total:		61–10 (.859)			
National champion Postseason invitational champion Conference regular season champion Conference regular season and conference tournament champion Division regular season champion Division regular season and conference tournament champion Conference tournament champion

=== College ===
Record table
Season	Team	Overall	Conference	Standing	Postseason
USC Trojans (Pacific-10 Conference) (2004–2005)
2004–05	USC #	10–15	5–13	10th	
USC:		10–15 (.400)	5–13 (.278)		
Fresno Pacific Sunbirds (Golden State Athletic Conference) (2007–2010)
2007–08	Fresno Pacific	19–12	10–10	6th	
2008–09	Fresno Pacific	26–8	18–2	1st	NAIA First Round
2009–10	Fresno Pacific	25–9	13–7	4th	NAIA Second Round
Fresno Pacific:		70–29 (.707)	41–19 (.683)		
Cal State San Marcos Cougars (NAIA independent) (2011–2015)
2011–12	Cal State San Marcos	19–12			
2012–13	Cal State San Marcos	23–7			NAIA First Round
2013–14	Cal State San Marcos	32–2			NAIA Quarterfinals
2014–15	Cal State San Marcos	30–4			NAIA Quarterfinals
Cal State San Marcos Cougars (California Collegiate Athletic Association) (2015–2016)
2015–16	Cal State San Marcos	15–12	11–9	6th	
Cal State San Marcos:		119–37 (.763)	11–9 (.550)		
Cal State LA Golden Eagles (California Collegiate Athletic Association) (2016–present)
2016–17	Cal State LA	14–16	9–11	8th	
2017–18	Cal State LA	13–16	9–13	9th	
2018–19	Cal State LA	18–12	13–9	8th	
2019–20	Cal State LA	13–16	8–14	8th	
2020–21	Cal State LA	0–0	0–0		
2021–22	Cal State LA	7–14	4–11	10th	
2022–23	Cal State LA	11–17	8–14	T–9th	
Cal State LA:		76–91 (.455)	51–72 (.415)		
Total:		275–172 (.615)			
National champion Postseason invitational champion Conference regular season champion Conference regular season and conference tournament champion Division regular season champion Division regular season and conference tournament champion Conference tournament champion

# Henry Bibby fired midseason. Jim Saia finished season as interim head coach.

== Personal ==
Saia and his wife, Stacey, have three daughters and a son.

Saia is close friends with Steve Lavin, having played on the same team with him at Sir Francis Drake High School and Chapman University, and served as an assistant coach when Lavin was UCLA's head coach.
