= 2001–02 Stanford Cardinal men's basketball team =

American college basketball season

2001–02 Stanford Cardinal men's basketball

NCAA tournament, second round
- Conference: Pacific-10 Conference

Ranking
- AP: No. 24
- Record: 20–10 (12–6 Pac-10)
- Head coach: Mike Montgomery (16th season)
- Assistant coaches: Tony Fuller; Eric Reveno; Russell Turner
- Home arena: Maples Pavilion (Capacity: 7,392)

2001–02 Pacific-10 Conference men's basketball standings
	Conf.				Overall
Team	W		L	PCT	W		L	PCT
No. 6 Oregon	14	–	4	.778	26	–	9	.743
California	12	–	6	.667	23	–	9	.719
No. 10 Arizona†	12	–	6	.667	24	–	10	.706
No. 18 USC	12	–	6	.667	22	–	10	.688
Stanford	12	–	6	.667	20	–	10	.667
No. 20 UCLA	11	–	7	.611	21	–	12	.636
Arizona State	7	–	11	.389	12	–	15	.444
Washington	5	–	13	.278	11	–	17	.393
Oregon State	4	–	14	.222	11	–	17	.393
Washington State	1	–	17	.056	6	–	21	.222
† Conference tournament winner As of July 10, 2011; Rankings from Coaches Poll

The 2001–02 Stanford Cardinal men's basketball team represented Stanford University during the 2001–02 NCAA Division I men's basketball season. The team finished second in the Pacific-10 Conference with a 12–6 conference record, 20–10 overall. The Cardinal competed in the 2002 NCAA Division I men's basketball tournament, losing to Kansas in the Second round.

== Roster ==
2001–02 Stanford Cardinal men's basketball team
Players
Coaches

Pos.	#	Name	Height	Weight	Year	Previous school	Hometown
F	1	Josh Childress	6 ft 8 in (2.03 m)	210 lb (95 kg)	Fr	Mayfair
C	11	Curtis Borchardt	7 ft 0 in (2.13 m)	230 lb (104 kg)	Jr	Eastlake	Redmond, Washington
F	21	Nick Robinson	6 ft 6 in (1.98 m)	200 lb (91 kg)	Fr		Liberty, Missouri
G/F	23	Casey Jacobsen	6 ft 6 in (1.98 m)	210 lb (95 kg)	Jr	Glendora	Glendora, California
G	24	Julius Barnes	6 ft 1 in (1.85 m)	185 lb (84 kg)	Jr		Rowland Heights, California
G	33	Matt Lottich	6 ft 4 in (1.93 m)	205 lb (93 kg)	So	New Trier	Winnetka, Illinois

Head coach

- Mike Montgomery (Long Beach State)

Assistant coach(es)

Legend

- (C) Team captain
- (S) Suspended
- (I) Ineligible
- (W) Walk-on
- Injured
- Current redshirt

Roster

== Schedule ==
Date time, TV	Rank^{#}	Opponent^{#}	Result	Record	Site city, state
Regular season
Nov 17, 2001*	No. 16	at New Mexico	W 81–66	1–0	The Pit; Albuquerque, New Mexico
Nov 20, 2001*	No. 14	Southern Utah	W 81–63	2–0	Maples Pavilion; Stanford, California
Nov 24, 2001*	No. 14	vs. Purdue	W 78–62	3–0	Conseco Fieldhouse; Indianapolis, Indiana
Dec 1, 2001*	No. 11	vs. Texas; Dell Classic 4 Kids	L 75–83 ^{OT}	3–1	United Center; Chicago, Illinois
Dec 15, 2001*	No. 12	Long Beach State	W 94–77	4–1	Maples Pavilion; Stanford, California
Dec 18, 2001*	No. 13	Belmont	W 97–63	5–1	Maples Pavilion; Stanford, California
Dec 19, 2001*	No. 13	Portland State	W 87–63	6–1	Maples Pavilion; Stanford, California
Dec 22, 2001*	No. 13	at BYU	L 76–81	6–2	Marriott Center; Provo, Utah
Dec 29, 2001*	No. 16	vs. No. 13 Michigan State	W 75–64	7–2	The Arena in Oakland; Oakland, California
Jan 4, 2002*	No. 12	California	W 82–62	8–2 (1–0)	Maples Pavilion; Stanford, California
Jan 6, 2002	No. 12	at California	L 54–68	8–3 (1–1)	Haas Pavilion; Berkeley, California
Jan 10, 2002	No. 14	at Oregon State	W 67–50	9–3 (2–1)	Gill Coliseum; Corvallis, Oregon
Jan 12, 2002	No. 14	at Oregon	L 79–87	9–4 (2–2)	McArthur Court; Eugene, Oregon
Jan 17, 2002	No. 19	Washington State	W 83–50	10–4 (3–2)	Maples Pavilion; Stanford, California
Jan 19, 2002	No. 19	Washington	W 105–60	11–4 (4–2)	Maples Pavilion; Stanford, California
Jan 24, 2002	No. 17	at No. 13 UCLA	W 86–76	12–4 (5–2)	Pauley Pavilion; Los Angeles, California
Jan 26, 2002	No. 17	at No. 23 USC	L 82–90	12–5 (5–3)	L.A. Sports Arena; Los Angeles, California
Jan 31, 2002	No. 18	Arizona State	W 90–81	13–5 (6–3)	Maples Pavilion; Stanford, California
Feb 2, 2002	No. 18	No. 19 Arizona	L 82–88 ^{OT}	13–6 (6–4)	Maples Pavilion; Stanford, California
Feb 7, 2002	No. 20	No. 13 Oregon	W 90–87 ^{OT}	14–6 (7–4)	Maples Pavilion; Stanford, California
Feb 9, 2002	No. 20	Oregon State	W 77–55	15–6 (8–4)	Maples Pavilion; Stanford, California
Feb 14, 2002	No. 12	at Washington	W 91–65	16–6 (9–4)	Bank of America Arena; Seattle, Washington
Feb 16, 2002	No. 12	at Washington State	W 76–63	17–6 (10–4)	Friel Court; Pullman, Washington
Feb 21, 2002	No. 10	No. 20 USC	L 58–77	17–7 (10–5)	Maples Pavilion; Stanford, California
Feb 23, 2002	No. 10	No. 25 UCLA	L 92–95	17–8 (10–6)	Maples Pavilion; Stanford, California
Feb 28, 2002	No. 17	at No. 14 Arizona	W 76–71	18–8 (11–6)	McKale Center; Tucson, Arizona
Mar 2, 2002	No. 17	at Arizona State	W 81–76	19–8 (12–6)	Wells Fargo Arena; Tempe, Arizona
Pac-10 tournament
Mar 7, 2002*	(5) No. 16	at (4) No. 22 USC	L 78–103	19–9	L.A. Sports Arena; Los Angeles, California
NCAA tournament
Mar 14, 2002*	(8 MW) No. 24	vs. (9 MW) No. 19 Western Kentucky; First Round	W 84–68	20–9	Edward Jones Dome; St. Louis, Missouri
Mar 16, 2002*	(8 MW) No. 24	vs. (1 MW) No. 2 Kansas; Second Round	L 63–86	20–10	Edward Jones Dome (31,484); St. Louis, Missouri
*Non-conference game. ^{#}Rankings from AP poll. (#) Tournament seedings in parentheses. All times are in Pacific Time. (#) during NCAA is seed within region. MW = Midwest Region.

Schedule Source:

== Rankings ==
Ranking movements Legend: ██ Increase in ranking ██ Decrease in ranking — = Not ranked
	Week																			
Poll	Pre	1	2	3	4	5	6	7	8	9	10	11	12	13	14	15	16	17	18	Final
AP	13	16	14	11	14	12	13	16	12	12	19	17	18	20	12	10	17	16	24	Not released
Coaches	15	15^	13	9	14	13	13	15	13	11	16	14	15	20	14	11	19	18	23	—

*AP does not release post-NCAA Tournament rankings
^Coaches did not release a week 2 poll

== 2002 NBA draft ==
Round	Pick	Player	NBA Team
1	18	Curtis Borchardt	Orlando Magic
1	22	Casey Jacobsen	Phoenix Suns
