= Łukasz Obrzut =

Polish-American basketball player

Łukasz Obrzut (Polish pronunciation: [ˈwukaʂ ˈɔbʐut]; born 31 August 1982 in Jędrzejów, Poland) is a Polish-American basketball player who played center for the University of Kentucky from 2003 to 2007.

== College career ==
Obrzut was part of Tubby Smith's 2003 recruiting class and quickly got the nickname "Woo" based on the pronunciation of his first name. He played in 123 games in his career at Kentucky for total of 196 points.

== Professional career ==
Obrzut was signed as a free agent by the Indiana Pacers in 2007 but was waived a few weeks later. He was picked up by NBA D-League Fort Wayne Mad Ants where he played 19 games, and was later picked up by the Bakersfield Jam where he played another 18 games to finish his American pro career. He played for the Polish Basketball League team Sportino Inowrocław in 2007–08 before returning to the US.

== Personal life ==
He married his college sweetheart, Nikkie Belcher in 2009 and they reside in Lexington, Kentucky. He was naturalized as a US citizen on 16 February 2017 in a ceremony at the Muhammad Ali Center in Louisville, Kentucky. He spends his days with his best friend and number one fan, Ethan Plew. Ethan is head of the “Woo Fan Club” located in Bedford, KY.
