= Steve Lavin =

American basketball player & coach (born 1964)

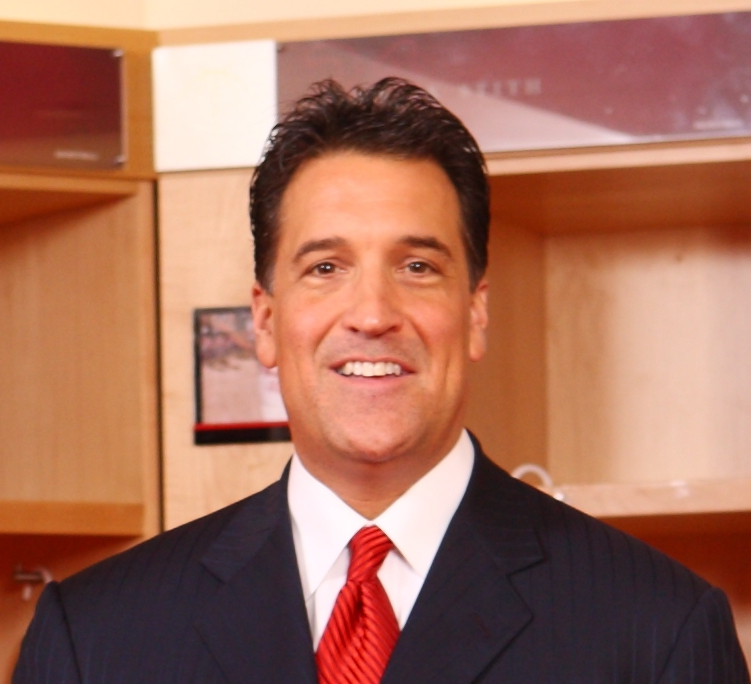
- Lavin in 2010

Biographical details
- Born: September 4, 1964 (age 62); San Francisco, California, U.S.

Playing career
- 1983–1984: San Francisco State
- 1985–1987: Chapman

Coaching career (HC unless noted)
- 1988–1991: Purdue (assistant)
- 1991–1996: UCLA (assistant)
- 1996–2003: UCLA
- 2010–2015: St. John's
- 2022–2026: San Diego

Head coaching record
- Overall: 284–233 (.549)
- Tournaments: 11–8 (NCAA Division I); 1–2 (NIT)

Accomplishments and honors

Championships
- As head coach: Pac-10 Regular Season (1997); As assistant coach: NCAA Division I Tournament (1995)

Awards
- Pac-10 Coach of the Year (2001)

Stephen Michael Lavin (born September 4, 1964) is an American college basketball coach and broadcaster who is the former head coach of the San Diego Toreros men's basketball team at the University of San Diego (USD). He previously served as head coach of the St. John's Red Storm and UCLA Bruins. In eleven full seasons as a head coach, Lavin had led teams to ten postseason appearances, highlighted by eight NCAA Tournament berths, an Elite Eight ('97), five NCAA Regional semifinals ('97, '98, '00, '01, '02) and nine campaigns of twenty or more wins. Lavin has also been a broadcaster for Fox Sports, CBS Sports and Pac-12 Network.

== Early life ==
Lavin was born on September 4, 1964, in San Francisco. He was raised in nearby Marin County and attended Ross Grammar School before his time at Sir Francis Drake High School in San Anselmo, California, where he was a member of the basketball team that won the 1982 California state championship with a 34–0 record.

Lavin initially attended San Francisco State University, where he played on the basketball team for two years. He transferred to Chapman University, from which he graduated in 1988 with a bachelor's degree in communications.

== Coaching career ==
Lavin's coaching career began in 1988 when he was hired as an assistant by Purdue head coach Gene Keady. After three years on the Boilermaker staff, Lavin returned to California when UCLA head coach Jim Harrick hired him as an assistant in 1991.

Prior to becoming head coach at UCLA, Lavin was an assistant coach on the Bruins' staff for five years, including the 1995 national championship team that finished with a 32–1 record.

=== UCLA ===
Shortly before the 1996–97 season began, UCLA fired Harrick for issues related to violations at a recruiting meal. Lavin was the assistant on staff with the longest tenure at UCLA and was selected as interim head coach.

Later that season on February 11, 1997, with the Bruins tied for first place in the Pac-10 with an 8–3 record, UCLA removed the "interim" tag from Lavin's title and formally named him as its 11th head coach. The Bruins then won their next 11 games en route to the Pac-10 title, before being eliminated by the Minnesota Gophers in the NCAA Midwest Regional Final.

Notable Lavin achievements at UCLA:

- During the period 1997 – 2002, Lavin's Bruins compiled nine consecutive overtime victories. These included victories over Arizona, Cincinnati (2002 NCAA second round double overtime victory over No. 1 West Region seed), Kentucky, and Stanford (then ranked No 1).
- In his time at UCLA, from 1996 to 2003, he compiled a record of 145–78.
- From 1989 to 2002 as an assistant and head coach, Lavin participated in 13 consecutive NCAA tournament appearances.
- During Lavin's tenure as a head coach, he was one of only two coaches in the country to lead a team to five NCAA regional semifinals (Sweet 16's) in six seasons – the other coach being Duke's Mike Krzyzewski.
- Lavin's record at UCLA in the first and second rounds of the NCAA tournament was 10–1. His winning percentage (90.9%) in the first two rounds is second only to Dean Smith in NCAA Tournament history.
- Lavin is the only college coach to have defeated the No. 1 team in the country in four consecutive collegiate seasons: Stanford in 2000 and 2001, Kansas in 2002 and Arizona in 2003.
- Lavin guided UCLA to six consecutive seasons of 20 or more wins, as well as six consecutive NCAA tournament appearances.
- As head coach at UCLA, Lavin and his staff recruited and signed the No. 1 rated recruiting class in the country in 1998 and 2001. Lavin signed seven McDonald's High School All-Americans.
- Fourteen of Lavin's former UCLA players became roster members of NBA teams: Trevor Ariza, Matt Barnes, Cedric Bozeman, Baron Davis, Dan Gadzuric, Ryan Hollins, Jason Kapono, Earl Watson, Jerome Moiso, Charles O'Bannon, Jelani McCoy, Toby Bailey, Dijon Thompson, and J. R. Henderson.

In March 2003, following Lavin's first losing season at UCLA (10–19) and the school's first losing season in 54 years, Lavin was relieved of his duties as head coach.

=== St. John's University ===
In 2010, Lavin was hired as the head men's basketball coach at St. John's University. During Lavin's tenure, three of his teams earned 20 or more wins, including two NCAA Tournament appearances.

In Lavin's first year, he coached the Red Storm to a 21–12 record. The 21 wins were St. John's highest total since the 2002–03 season and its NCAA tournament appearance was the first since 2002.

Lavin inherited a team that finished in 13th place in the Big East Conference in 2009–10. The next year the same players finished at 12–6. A jump of similar magnitude had previously occurred only one other time in Big East Conference history.

The Red Storm finished the 2011 season ranked 18th in the Associated Press Top 25, marking the first time it qualified for the postseason as a ranked team since 2000–01. The Red Storm posted a 7–1 record at Madison Square Garden and saw its home attendance climb by 38.1 percent, marking the fourth-largest increase in NCAA Division I men's basketball.

Lavin underwent treatment for cancer on October 6, 2011, consequently only coaching four games in the 2011–12 season as his doctors modified his schedule during recovery. [

In 2012–13, Lavin's third year as head coach, St. John's finished with a 17–16 overall record. The Red Storm received an NIT bid, and earned a victory at the buzzer at Saint Joseph's before falling on the road to Virginia in the next game.

In the 2013–14 season, Lavin led the Red Storm to a 20–13 record finishing conference play in a three-way, third place tie that resulted in another invitation to the NIT, where they were upset by Robert Morris.

In 2014–15, Lavin led St. John's to a 21–12 record and a second NCAA tournament appearance.

Almost immediately after the season ended, on March 27, 2015, Lavin was fired. Thereafter, he returned to his role as a college basketball TV analyst in studio and in the booth for games.

=== University of San Diego ===
On April 6, 2022, Lavin made his return to coaching as he was hired to serve as the head coach of the San Diego Toreros. He currently has a record of 35–52 in 3 season as the head coach of the Toreros.

On February 18, 2026, USD fired Lavin with three games left in the 2025–26 season, but announced that he would stay through the end of the season.

== Broadcasting career ==
Lavin began his broadcasting career in 2003, soon after being fired from UCLA, when he signed a multi-year deal with ABC and ESPN. For seven years he made regular appearances on ESPN College GameNight and provided color commentary alongside his partners Brent Musburger and Dave O'Brien at prime-time college games around the country. Lavin also contributed to ESPN coverage on the NBA draft.

After being fired by St. John's, Lavin joined the Fox Sports, CBS Sports and Pac-12 Network broadcasting teams as a college basketball and NBA analyst.

As of October 2026, Lavin rejoined ESPN as a college basketball analyst and color commentator.

== Awards and honors ==
- 1997 – International Inspiration Award from the Hugh O'Brien Youth Foundation (HOBY)
- 1998 – Chapman University Alumnus of the Year (also serves on Board of Governors at Chapman University)
- 2001 – Pac-10 Coach of the Year
- 2005 – Distinguished Alumni award from the Dodge College of Film and Media Arts from Chapman University
- 2011 – District II Coach of the Year

== Philanthropy ==
Lavin has participated in and been involved with numerous organizations and charities throughout his coaching career. Such charities include the Jimmy V Foundation, Make-A-Wish Foundation, United Service Organization, Special Olympics, City of Hope, Coaches vs. Cancer, Pediatric Cancer Research Foundation, and Wounded Warriors.

In an October 2010 ceremony with Anthony Butler, executive director of St. John's Bread & Life, and Steve Starker of BTIG Brokerage, Lavin made a $35,000, multi-year pledge to aid New York City's homeless and hungry. Lavin was honored in 2011 with The Johnny's Angel Award, celebrating his contributions to the Bread and Life Soup Kitchen.

Lavin has been very active with The V Foundation for Cancer Research, where he has joined in numerous fundraising and awareness events. Lavin is part of The V Foundation President's Club, donating more than $50,000 to the organization. Other members of the leadership team are Duke's Mike Krzyzewski, Kentucky's John Calipari, and Michigan State's Tom Izzo. In addition, Lavin has been extremely involved with Coaches vs. Cancer, a foundation that Lavin has helped raise over $1.5 million for since 2010.

== Head coaching record ==
Record table
Season	Team	Overall	Conference	Standing	Postseason
UCLA Bruins (Pacific-10 Conference) (1996–2003)
1996–97	UCLA	24–8	15–3	1st	NCAA Division I Elite Eight
1997–98	UCLA	24–9	12–6	3rd	NCAA Division I Sweet 16
1998–99	UCLA	22–9	12–6	3rd	NCAA Division I Round of 64
1999–00	UCLA	21–12	10–8	T–4th	NCAA Division I Sweet 16
2000–01	UCLA	23–9	14–4	3rd	NCAA Division I Sweet 16
2001–02	UCLA	21–12	11–7	6th	NCAA Division I Sweet 16
2002–03	UCLA	10–19	6–12	T–6th	
UCLA:		145–78 (.650)	80–46 (.635)		
St. John's Red Storm (Big East Conference) (2010–2015)
2010–11	St. John's	21–12	12–6	T–3rd	NCAA Division I Round of 64
2011–12	St. John's	13–19	6–12	T–11th	
2012–13	St. John's	17–16	8–10	11th	NIT Second Round
2013–14	St. John's	20–13	10–8	T–3rd	NIT First Round
2014–15	St. John's	21–12	10–8	5th	NCAA Division I Round of 64
St. John's:		92–72 (.561)	46–44 (.511)		
San Diego Toreros (West Coast Conference) (2022–2026)
2022–23	San Diego	11–20	4–12	9th	
2023–24	San Diego	18–15	7–9	5th	
2024–25	San Diego	6–27	2–16	11th	
2025–26	San Diego	12–21	5–13	11th	
San Diego:		47–83 (.362)	18–50 (.265)		
Total:		284–233 (.549)			
National champion Postseason invitational champion Conference regular season champion Conference regular season and conference tournament champion Division regular season champion Division regular season and conference tournament champion Conference tournament champion
