= Jared Newson =

American basketball player

Jared Newson (born September 26, 1984 in Belleville, Illinois) is an American basketball player who played for the Sioux Falls Skyforce and Bakersfield Jam in the NBA D-League.

On October 25, 2014, Newson was inducted into the UT Martin Athletics Hall of Fame.
