= Jamal Sampson =

American basketball player (born 1983)

Personal information
- Born: May 15, 1983 (age 43) Inglewood, California, U.S.
- Listed height: 6 ft 11 in (2.11 m)
- Listed weight: 235 lb (107 kg)

Career information
- High school: Mater Dei (Santa Ana, California)
- College: California (2001–2002)
- NBA draft: 2002: 2nd round, 47th overall pick
- Drafted by: Utah Jazz
- Playing career: 2002–2012
- Position: Center / power forward
- Number: 31, 7

Career history
- 2002–2003: Milwaukee Bucks
- 2003–2004: Los Angeles Lakers
- 2004–2005: Charlotte Bobcats
- 2005–2006: Sacramento Kings
- 2006–2007: Denver Nuggets
- 2007–2008: Liaoning Panpan Hunters
- 2008: Zain
- 2008–2009: DongGuan New Century
- 2009–2010: Smart Gilas
- 2010: Shanxi Brave Dragons
- 2011–2012: Texas Legends

Career highlights
- Pac-10 All-Freshman Team (2002); Third-team Parade All-American (2001)

Career NBA statistics
- Points: 142 (2.0 ppg)
- Rebounds: 242 (3.4 rpg)
- Blocks: 32 (0.4 bpg)
- Stats at NBA.com
- Stats at Basketball Reference

Jamal Wesley Sampson (born May 15, 1983) is an American former professional basketball player. He played one season of college basketball for the California Golden Bears before being selected by the Utah Jazz in the second round (47th overall) of the 2002 NBA draft.

== College career ==
Sampson played one season of college basketball for the California Golden Bears in 2001–02, where he averaged 6.4 points, 6.5 rebounds and 1.17 blocks in 32 games. He posted four double-doubles, and had 15 points, 17 rebounds and four blocks versus Washington. He was named to the Pac-10 All-Freshman Team.

== Professional career ==
Sampson was selected by the Utah Jazz in the second round (47th overall) of the 2002 NBA draft. He was immediately traded by the Jazz to the Orlando Magic, and then again by the Magic to the Milwaukee Bucks on draft night. He signed with the Bucks on September 30, 2002, but was waived on July 10, 2003, after one season.

On July 24, 2003, Sampson signed with the Los Angeles Lakers. After playing 10 games for the Lakers in 2003–04, he was selected by the Charlotte Bobcats in the expansion draft in June 2004. He was waived by the Bobcats on February 8, 2005. He posted career-best averages of 3.4 points and 5.3 rebounds in 23 games for Charlotte in the 2004–05 season.

On August 8, 2005, Sampson signed with the Sacramento Kings. He appeared in 12 games for the Kings during the 2005–06 season.

On July 28, 2006, Sampson signed with the Denver Nuggets. He played 22 games in 2006–07, with his final NBA game coming on April 18, 2007, in a 100–77 victory over the San Antonio Spurs, where Sampson recorded 13 rebounds in 27 minutes as a starter.

On October 1, 2007, Sampson signed with the Dallas Mavericks. He was waived on October 22, prior to the start of the regular season.

In November 2007, Sampson had an unsuccessful tryout with German team Skyliners Frankfurt. In December 2007, he signed with Liaoning Panpan Hunters of the Chinese Basketball Association (CBA) for the rest of the season. In April 2008, he signed with Zain of the Jordanian Premier Basketball League for the rest of the season.

On September 30, 2008, Sampson signed with the Toronto Raptors. He was waived on October 22, prior to the start of the regular season. Two days later, he signed with DongGuan New Century for the 2008–09 CBA season. He left DongGuan in February 2009.

In December 2009, Sampson signed with Smart Gilas of the Philippine Basketball Association (PBA) during the 2009–10 season. He replaced C. J. Giles as the team's candidate to be a naturalized player for future international competitions. Sampson left Smart Gilas in January 2010.

In November 2010, Sampson joined Shanxi Brave Dragons for the 2010–11 CBA season. He left the team in December 2010.

In November 2011, Sampson was selected by the Texas Legends with the fifth overall pick in the 2011 NBA Development League draft. He appeared in two games for the Legends to start the 2011–12 NBA D-League season before signing with the Boston Celtics on December 12 for training camp. He was waived by the Celtics on December 22, prior to the start of the 2011–12 NBA season. He was waived by the Legends on January 9, 2012.

== Career statistics ==
Legend
GP	Games played	GS	Games started	MPG	Minutes per game
FG%	Field goal percentage	3P%	3-point field goal percentage	FT%	Free throw percentage
RPG	Rebounds per game	APG	Assists per game	SPG	Steals per game
BPG	Blocks per game	PPG	Points per game	**Bold**	Career high

=== NBA ===
Year	Team	GP	GS	MPG	FG%	3P%	FT%	RPG	APG	SPG	BPG	PPG
2002–03	Milwaukee	5	0	1.6	.000	.000	.000	0.4	0.2	**0.2**	0.0	0.0
2003–04	Los Angeles	10	2	13.0	.478	.000	.583	5.2	**0.7**	**0.2**	0.4	2.9
2004–05	Charlotte	**23**	0	**14.3**	.452	.000	**.590**	**5.3**	0.3	**0.2**	**0.7**	**3.4**
2005–06	Sacramento	12	0	3.3	**.714**	.000	.000	1.5	0.4	0.0	0.3	0.8
2006–07	Denver	22	**3**	5.7	.643	.000	.429	2.2	0.2	0.1	0.3	1.1
Career		72	5	8.8	.491	.000	.537	3.4	0.4	0.1	0.4	2.0

=== College ===
Year	Team	GP	GS	MPG	FG%	3P%	FT%	RPG	APG	SPG	BPG	PPG
2001–02	California	**32**	**31**	**24.9**	**.426**	.000	**.526**	**6.5**	**1.2**	**0.5**	**1.7**	**6.4**
Career		32	31	24.9	.426	.000	.526	6.5	1.2	0.5	1.7	6.4

== Coaching career ==
In 2012, Sampson became an assistant coach for Brethren Christian Junior/Senior High School.

== Personal life ==
Sampson is the cousin of former NBA All-Star, Ralph Sampson.
