= Andre Patterson (basketball) =

American basketball player (born 1983)

Personal information
- Born: May 12, 1983 (age 43) Los Angeles, California, U.S.
- Listed height: 6 ft 7 in (2.01 m)

Career information
- High school: Concordia Lutheran (Fort Wayne, Indiana); Washington Prep (Los Angeles, California)
- College: UCLA (2001–2003); Tennessee (2004–2006)
- NBA draft: 2006: undrafted
- Playing career: 2006–2009
- Position: Small forward

Career history
- 2006–2007: Los Angeles D-Fenders
- 2008: Dakota Wizards
- 2008: Gatos de Monagas
- 2008–2009: Reno Bighorns
- 2009: Anaheim Arsenal

Andre Patterson Jr. (born May 12, 1983) is an American former professional basketball player. He is 6 feet 9 1/2 inches (2.07 m) in height. He is the son of Andre Patterson Sr. who played professionally and the half-brother of Ayanna Patterson
