= 2001–02 NCAA Division I men's basketball season =

Basketball season

- Preseason AP No. 1: Duke Blue Devils
- Regular season: November 9, 2001– March 10, 2002
- NCAA Tournament: 2002
- Tournament dates: March 12 – April 1, 2002
- National Championship: Georgia Dome; Atlanta, Georgia
- NCAA Champions: Maryland Terrapins
- Other champions: Memphis Tigers (NIT)
- Player of the Year (Naismith, Wooden): Jason Williams, Duke Blue Devils

The 2001–02 NCAA Division I men's basketball season began on November 9, 2001, progressed through the regular season and conference tournaments, and concluded with the 2002 NCAA Men's Division I Basketball Tournament Championship Game on April 1, 2002, at the Georgia Dome in Atlanta, Georgia. The Maryland Terrapins won their first NCAA national championship with a 64–52 victory over the Indiana Hoosiers.

== Season headlines ==
- The Atlantic Sun Conference competed under that name for the first time. Previously it had been known as the Trans America Athletic Conference.
- The preseason Associated Press All-American team was named on November 6, 2001. Jason Williams of Duke was the unanimous leading vote-getter (72 of 72 votes). The rest of the team included Kareem Rush of Missouri (47 votes), Tayshaun Prince of Kentucky (46), Casey Jacobsen of Stanford (45) and Frank Williams of Illinois (31).
- Jason Conley of Virginia Military Institute became the first freshman ever to win the season scoring title, averaging 29.3 points per game in 28 games.
- Senior John Linehan of Providence became the all-time Division I steals leader with 385 for his career, while fellow senior Desmond Cambridge of Alabama A&M coincidentally finishes his career with the second highest steals total of 377.
- On March 1, 2002, sophomore Ronald Blackshear of Marshall tied an NCAA record by making 11 consecutive three-point shots in a game against Akron, but also makes 14 total in the second-highest single game output in NCAA history.
- The National Invitation Tournament expanded from 32 to 40 teams.
- Two teams whose head coaches were people of color met in an NCAA tournament Final Four game for the first time, when Indiana, coached by Mike Davis, defeated Oklahoma, coached by Kelvin Sampson, 73–64 in a national semifinal game on March 30, 2002.

== Major rule changes ==
Beginning in 2001–02, the following rules changes were implemented:

- Both direct and indirect technical fouls penalized by two shots and returned to point of interruption.
- Officials could check an official courtside monitor to determine if a try was a three- or two-point attempt, regardless of whether the try was successful.

== Season outlook ==
=== Pre-season polls ===
The top 25 from the AP and ESPN/USA Today Coaches Polls November 5, 2001.

Associated Press
Ranking	Team
1	Duke (61)
2	Maryland (6)
3	Illinois (2)
4	Kentucky (3)
5	UCLA
6	Florida
7	Kansas
8	Missouri
9	Iowa
10	St. Joseph's
11	Virginia
12	Memphis
13	Stanford
14	Georgetown
15	Michigan State
16	Temple
17	Boston College
18	Oklahoma State
19	North Carolina
20	Southern California
21	Syracuse
22	Indiana
23	Texas
24	Alabama
25	Oklahoma

ESPN/USA Today Coaches
Ranking	Team
1	Duke (30)
2	Illinois (1)
3	Maryland
4	Kentucky
5	Florida
6	UCLA
7	Kansas
8	Iowa
9	Missouri
10	St. Joseph's
11	Virginia
12	Michigan State
13	Memphis
14	Georgetown
15	Stanford
16	Boston College
17	Temple
18	Oklahoma State
19	North Carolina
20	Syracuse
21	Indiana
22	Texas
23	Oklahoma
24	Southern California
25	Fresno State

== Conference membership changes ==
These schools joined new conferences for the 2001–02 season.

School	Former conference	New conference
Albany Great Danes	NCAA Division I independent	America East Conference
American Eagles	Colonial Athletic Association	Patriot League
Belmont Bruins	NCAA Division I independent	Atlantic Sun Conference
Binghamton Bearcats	NCAA Division II independent	America East Conference
Birmingham–Southern Panthers	TSAC (NAIA)	NCAA Division I independent
Boise State Broncos	Big West Conference	Western Athletic Conference
Cal State Northridge Matadors	Big Sky Conference	Big West Conference
Delaware Fightin' Blue Hens	America East Conference	Colonial Athletic Association
Drexel Dragons	America East Conference	Colonial Athletic Association
East Carolina Pirates	Colonial Athletic Association	Conference USA
Hofstra Pride	America East Conference	Colonial Athletic Association
Indiana–Purdue Fort Wayne (IPFW) Mastodons	Great Lakes Valley Conference (D-II)	NCAA Division I independent
Lipscomb Bisons	TSAC (NAIA)	NCAA Division I independent
Louisiana Tech Bulldogs	Sun Belt Conference	Western Athletic Conference
Morris Brown Wolverines	NCAA Division II independent	NCAA Division I independent
Richmond Spiders	Colonial Athletic Association	Atlantic 10 Conference
Stony Brook Seawolves	NCAA Division I independent	America East Conference
TCU Horned Frogs	Western Athletic Conference	Conference USA
Towson Tigers	America East Conference	Colonial Athletic Association
UC Riverside Highlanders	NCAA Division II independent	Big West Conference
Youngstown State Penguins	Mid-Continent Conference	Horizon League

== Regular season ==
=== Conferences ===
==== Conference winners and tournaments ====
Conference	Regular Season Winner	Conference Player of the Year	Conference Tournament	Tournament Venue (City)	Tournament winner
America East Conference	Vermont	T. J. Sorrentine, Vermont	2002 America East men's basketball tournament	Matthews Arena (Boston, Massachusetts) (Except Finals)	Boston University
Atlantic 10 Conference	Temple & St. Joseph's (East); Xavier (West)	David West, Xavier	2002 Atlantic 10 men's basketball tournament	The Spectrum (Philadelphia, Pennsylvania)	Xavier
Atlantic Coast Conference	Maryland	Juan Dixon, Maryland	2002 ACC men's basketball tournament	Charlotte Coliseum (Charlotte, North Carolina)	Duke
Atlantic Sun Conference	Georgia State & Troy	Thomas Terrell, Georgia State	2002 Atlantic Sun men's basketball tournament	UCF Arena (Orlando, Florida)	Florida Atlantic
Big 12 Conference	Kansas	Drew Gooden, Kansas	2002 Big 12 men's basketball tournament	Kemper Arena (Kansas City, Missouri)	Oklahoma
Big East Conference	Connecticut (East); Pittsburgh (West)	Caron Butler, Connecticut & Brandin Knight, Pittsburgh	2002 Big East men's basketball tournament	Madison Square Garden (New York City)	Connecticut
Big Sky Conference	Montana State	Jason Erickson, Montana State	2002 Big Sky men's basketball tournament	Brick Breeden Fieldhouse (Bozeman, Montana)	Montana
Big South Conference	Winthrop	Greg Lewis, Winthrop	2002 Big South Conference men's basketball tournament	Roanoke Civic Center (Roanoke, Virginia)	Winthrop
Big Ten Conference	Ohio State, Illinois, Indiana & Wisconsin	Jared Jeffries, Indiana	2002 Big Ten Conference men's basketball tournament	Conseco Fieldhouse (Indianapolis, Indiana)	Ohio State
Big West Conference	Utah State & UC Irvine	Jerry Green, UC Irvine	2002 Big West Conference men's basketball tournament	Anaheim Convention Center (Anaheim, California)	UC Santa Barbara
Colonial Athletic Association	UNC Wilmington	Brett Blizzard, UNC Wilmington	2002 CAA men's basketball tournament	Richmond Coliseum (Richmond, Virginia)	UNC Wilmington
Conference USA	Cincinnati (American); Memphis (National)	Steve Logan, Cincinnati	2002 Conference USA men's basketball tournament	Firstar Center (Cincinnati, Ohio)	Cincinnati
Horizon League	Butler	Rylan Hainje, Butler	2002 Horizon League men's basketball tournament	CSU Convocation Center (Cleveland, Ohio)	Illinois-Chicago
Ivy League	Penn, Yale & Princeton	Ugonna Onyekwe, Penn	No Tournament (Penn received NCAA automatic bid via three-way playoff)		
Metro Atlantic Athletic Conference	Rider & Marist	Mario Porter, Rider	2002 MAAC men's basketball tournament	Pepsi Arena (Albany, New York)	Siena
Mid-American Conference	Kent State (East); Ball State (West)	Keith McLeod, Bowling Green	2002 MAC men's basketball tournament	Gund Arena (Cleveland, Ohio)	Kent State
Mid-Continent Conference	Valparaiso	Luboš Bartoň, Valparaiso	2002 Mid-Continent Conference men's basketball tournament	Allen County War Memorial Coliseum (Fort Wayne, Indiana)	Valparaiso
Mid-Eastern Athletic Conference	Hampton	Tommy Adams, Hampton	2002 Mid-Eastern Athletic Conference men's basketball tournament	Richmond Coliseum (Richmond, Virginia)	Hampton
Missouri Valley Conference	Southern Illinois	Kyle Korver, Creighton	2002 Missouri Valley Conference men's basketball tournament	Savvis Center (St. Louis, Missouri)	Creighton
Mountain West Conference	Wyoming	Britton Johnsen, Utah	2002 MWC men's basketball tournament	Thomas & Mack Center (Paradise, Nevada)	San Diego State
Northeast Conference	Central Connecticut State	Corsley Edwards, Central Connecticut State	2002 Northeast Conference men's basketball tournament	Campus Sites	Central Connecticut State
Ohio Valley Conference	Tennessee Tech	Henry Domercant, Eastern Illinois	2002 Ohio Valley Conference men's basketball tournament	Kentucky International Convention Center (Louisville, Kentucky) (Semifinals and Finals)	Murray State
Pacific-10 Conference	Oregon	Sam Clancy Jr., USC	2002 Pacific-10 Conference men's basketball tournament	Staples Center (Los Angeles)	Arizona
Patriot League	American	Patrick Doctor, American	2002 Patriot League men's basketball tournament	Campus Sites	Holy Cross
Southeastern Conference	Florida, Kentucky & Georgia (East); Alabama (West)	Erwin Dudley, Alabama	2002 SEC men's basketball tournament	Georgia Dome (Atlanta, Georgia)	Mississippi State
Southern Conference	Davidson, UNC Greensboro & East Tennessee State (North); Charleston, Georgia Southern and Chattanooga (South)	Dimeco Childress, ETSU (Coaches); Jason Conley, VMI (Media)	2002 Southern Conference men's basketball tournament	North Charleston Coliseum (North Charleston, South Carolina)	Davidson
Southland Conference	McNeese State	McEverett Powers, Texas-San Antonio	2002 Southland Conference men's basketball tournament	Burton Coliseum (Lake Charles, Louisiana) (Finals)	McNeese State
Southwestern Athletic Conference	Alcorn State	Paul Haynes, Grambling State	2002 Southwestern Athletic Conference men's basketball tournament	Fair Park Arena (Birmingham, Alabama)	Alcorn State
Sun Belt Conference	Western Kentucky (East); Louisiana–Lafayette (West)	Héctor Romero, New Orleans	2002 Sun Belt men's basketball tournament	Lakefront Arena (New Orleans, Louisiana)	Western Kentucky
West Coast Conference	Gonzaga	Dan Dickau, Gonzaga	2002 West Coast Conference men's basketball tournament	Jenny Craig Pavilion (San Diego)	Gonzaga
Western Athletic Conference	Tulsa	Melvin Ely, Fresno State	2002 WAC men's basketball tournament	Reynolds Center (Tulsa, Oklahoma)	Hawaiʻi

==== Conference standings ====
2001–02 America East Conference men's basketball standings
	Conf.				Overall
Team	W		L	PCT	W		L	PCT
Vermont	13	–	3	.813	21	–	8	.724
Boston University †	13	–	3	.813	22	–	10	.688
Hartford	10	–	6	.625	14	–	18	.438
New Hampshire	8	–	8	.500	11	–	17	.393
Maine	7	–	9	.438	12	–	18	.400
Binghamton	6	–	10	.375	9	–	19	.321
Albany	5	–	11	.313	8	–	20	.286
Northeastern	5	–	11	.313	7	–	21	.250
Stony Brook	5	–	11	.313	6	–	22	.214
† 2002 America East tournament winner

2001–02 ACC men's basketball standings
	Conf.				Overall
Team	W		L	PCT	W		L	PCT
No. 4 Maryland	15	–	1	.938	32	–	4	.889
No. 1 Duke†	13	–	3	.813	31	–	4	.886
Wake Forest	9	–	7	.563	21	–	13	.618
NC State	9	–	7	.563	23	–	11	.676
Virginia	7	–	9	.438	17	–	12	.586
Georgia Tech	7	–	9	.438	15	–	16	.484
North Carolina	4	–	12	.250	8	–	20	.286
Florida State	4	–	12	.250	12	–	17	.414
Clemson	4	–	12	.250	13	–	17	.433
† 2002 ACC tournament winner Rankings from AP Poll

2001–02 Atlantic 10 men's basketball standings
	Conf.				Overall
Team	W		L	PCT	W		L	PCT
East
Saint Joseph's	12	–	4	.750	19	–	12	.613
Temple	12	–	4	.750	19	–	15	.559
St. Bonaventure	8	–	8	.500	17	–	13	.567
UMass	6	–	10	.375	13	–	16	.448
Fordham	4	–	12	.250	8	–	20	.286
Rhode Island	4	–	12	.250	8	–	20	.286
West
No. 22 Xavier †	14	–	2	.875	26	–	6	.813
Richmond	11	–	5	.688	22	–	14	.611
Dayton	10	–	6	.625	21	–	11	.656
La Salle	6	–	10	.375	15	–	17	.469
George Washington	5	–	11	.313	12	–	16	.429
Duquesne	4	–	12	.250	9	–	19	.321
† 2002 Atlantic 10 Tournament winner Rankings from AP Poll

2001–02 Atlantic Sun men's basketball standings
	Conf.				Overall
Team	W		L	PCT	W		L	PCT
Georgia State	14	–	6	.700	20	–	11	.645
Troy State	14	–	6	.700	18	–	10	.643
Florida Atlantic †	13	–	7	.650	19	–	12	.613
Jacksonville	12	–	8	.600	18	–	12	.600
UCF	12	–	8	.600	17	–	12	.586
Samford	12	–	8	.600	15	–	14	.517
Jacksonville State	8	–	12	.400	13	–	16	.448
Belmont	8	–	12	.400	11	–	17	.393
Stetson	7	–	13	.350	10	–	16	.385
Campbell	6	–	14	.300	8	–	19	.296
Mercer	4	–	16	.200	6	–	23	.207
† 2002 Atlantic Sun Tournament winner As of March 4, 2003; Rankings from AP Poll

2001–02 Big 12 men's basketball standings
	Conf.				Overall
Team	W		L	PCT	W		L	PCT
No. 2 Kansas	16	–	0	1.000	33	–	4	.892
No. 3 Oklahoma †	13	–	3	.813	31	–	5	.861
Texas	10	–	6	.625	22	–	12	.647
No. 20 Oklahoma State	10	–	6	.625	23	–	9	.719
Texas Tech	10	–	6	.625	23	–	9	.719
Missouri	9	–	7	.563	24	–	12	.667
Kansas State	6	–	10	.375	13	–	16	.448
Nebraska	6	–	10	.375	13	–	15	.464
Colorado	5	–	11	.313	15	–	14	.517
Baylor	4	–	12	.250	14	–	16	.467
Iowa State	4	–	12	.250	12	–	19	.387
Texas A&M	3	–	13	.188	9	–	22	.290
† 2002 Big 12 Tournament winner Rankings from AP poll

2001–02 Big East men's basketball standings
	Conf.				Overall
Team	W		L	PCT	W		L	PCT
East
No. 10 Connecticut†	13	–	3	.813	27	–	7	.794
No. 21 Miami	10	–	6	.625	24	–	8	.750
Boston College	8	–	8	.500	20	–	12	.625
Villanova	7	–	9	.438	19	–	13	.594
Providence	6	–	10	.375	15	–	16	.484
Virginia Tech*	4	–	12	.250	10	–	18	.357
St. John's#	0	–	7	.000	7	–	11	.389
West
No. 9 Pittsburgh	13	–	3	.813	29	–	6	.829
Notre Dame	10	–	6	.625	22	–	11	.667
Georgetown	9	–	7	.563	19	–	11	.633
Syracuse	9	–	7	.563	23	–	13	.639
Rutgers	8	–	8	.500	18	–	13	.581
Seton Hall	5	–	11	.313	12	–	18	.400
West Virginia*	1	–	15	.063	8	–	20	.286
† 2002 Big East tournament winner As of April 1, 2002; Rankings from AP Poll; *Did not qualify for 2002 Big East tournament. #St. John's had 14 regular-season games vacated due to sanctions against the program; the school′s disputed record was 9–7, 20–12.

2001–02 Big Sky men's basketball standings
	Conf.				Overall
Team	W		L	PCT	W		L	PCT
Montana State	12	–	2	.857	20	–	10	.667
Eastern Washington	10	–	4	.714	17	–	13	.567
Weber State	8	–	6	.571	18	–	11	.621
Montana †	7	–	7	.500	16	–	15	.516
Northern Arizona	7	–	7	.500	14	–	14	.500
Portland State	6	–	8	.429	12	–	16	.429
Idaho State	3	–	11	.214	10	–	17	.370
Sacramento State	3	–	11	.214	9	–	19	.321
† Conference tournament winner

2001–02 Big South Conference men's basketball standings
	Conf.				Overall
Team	W		L	PCT	W		L	PCT
Winthrop †	10	–	4	.714	19	–	12	.613
UNC Asheville	10	–	4	.714	13	–	15	.464
Radford	9	–	5	.643	15	–	16	.484
Charleston Southern	8	–	6	.571	12	–	17	.414
Elon	7	–	7	.500	13	–	16	.448
Coastal Carolina	5	–	9	.357	8	–	20	.286
High Point	5	–	9	.357	11	–	19	.367
Liberty	2	–	12	.143	5	–	25	.167
† 2002 Big South tournament winner Rankings from AP Poll

2001–02 Big Ten Conference men's basketball standings
	Conf.				Overall
Team	W		L	PCT	W		L	PCT
No. 13 Illinois	11	–	5	.688	26	–	9	.743
No. 23 Indiana	11	–	5	.688	25	–	12	.676
Wisconsin	11	–	5	.688	19	–	13	.594
Michigan State	10	–	6	.625	19	–	12	.613
Minnesota	9	–	7	.563	18	–	13	.581
Northwestern	7	–	9	.438	16	–	13	.552
Iowa	5	–	11	.313	19	–	16	.543
Purdue	5	–	11	.313	13	–	18	.419
Michigan	5	–	11	.313	11	–	18	.379
Penn State	3	–	13	.188	7	–	21	.250
No. 14 Ohio State*†	0	–	0	–	0	–	0	–
† 2002 Big Ten tournament winner Rankings from AP poll *Ohio State: 30 reg. season games; 2 NCAA Tourn. games vacated due to sanctions against the program Disputed record: Ohio State-(24-8)(11-5)

2001–02 Big West men's basketball standings
	Conf.				Overall
Team	W		L	PCT	W		L	PCT
Utah State	13	–	5	.722	23	–	8	.742
UC Irvine	13	–	5	.722	21	–	11	.656
UC Santa Barbara †	11	–	7	.611	20	–	11	.645
Pacific	11	–	7	.611	20	–	10	.667
Cal State Northridge	11	–	7	.611	12	–	16	.429
Cal Poly	9	–	9	.500	15	–	12	.556
Long Beach State	9	–	9	.500	13	–	17	.433
Idaho	6	–	12	.333	9	–	19	.321
UC Riverside	5	–	13	.278	8	–	18	.308
Cal State Fullerton	2	–	16	.111	5	–	22	.185
† 2002 Big West tournament winner As of April 10, 2002; Rankings from AP poll

2001–02 CAA men's basketball standings
	Conf.				Overall
Team	W		L	PCT	W		L	PCT
UNC Wilmington†	14	–	4	.778	23	–	10	.697
George Mason	13	–	5	.722	19	–	10	.655
VCU	11	–	7	.611	21	–	11	.656
Drexel	11	–	7	.611	14	–	14	.500
Delaware	9	–	9	.500	14	–	16	.467
Old Dominion	7	–	11	.389	13	–	16	.448
Towson	7	–	11	.389	11	–	18	.379
William & Mary	7	–	11	.389	10	–	19	.345
James Madison	6	–	12	.333	14	–	15	.483
Hofstra	5	–	13	.278	12	–	20	.375
† 2002 CAA tournament winner Rankings from AP poll

2001–02 Conference USA men's basketball standings
	Conf.				Overall
Team	W		L	PCT	W		L	PCT
American
No. 5 Cincinnati †	14	–	2	.875	31	–	4	.886
No. 12 Marquette	13	–	3	.813	26	–	7	.788
Charlotte	11	–	5	.688	18	–	12	.600
Saint Louis	9	–	7	.563	15	–	16	.484
Louisville	8	–	8	.500	19	–	13	.594
East Carolina	5	–	11	.313	12	–	18	.400
DePaul	2	–	14	.125	9	–	19	.321
National
Memphis	12	–	4	.750	27	–	9	.750
Houston	9	–	7	.563	18	–	15	.545
South Florida	8	–	8	.500	19	–	13	.594
TCU	6	–	10	.375	16	–	15	.516
UAB	6	–	10	.375	13	–	17	.433
Tulane	5	–	11	.313	14	–	15	.483
Southern Miss	4	–	12	.250	10	–	17	.370
† 2002 Conference USA Tournament winner Rankings from AP Poll

2001–02 Horizon League men's basketball standings
	Conf.				Overall
Team	W		L	PCT	W		L	PCT
Butler	12	–	4	.750	26	–	6	.813
Detroit Mercy	11	–	5	.688	18	–	13	.581
Milwaukee	11	–	5	.688	16	–	13	.552
Wright State	9	–	7	.563	17	–	11	.607
Loyola–Chicago	9	–	7	.563	17	–	13	.567
UIC †	8	–	8	.500	20	–	14	.588
Cleveland State	6	–	10	.375	12	–	16	.429
Green Bay	4	–	12	.250	9	–	21	.300
Youngstown State	2	–	14	.125	5	–	23	.179
† 2002 Horizon League Tournament winner

2001–02 Ivy League men's basketball standings
	Conf.				Overall
Team	W		L	PCT	W		L	PCT
Penn	11	–	3	.786	25	–	7	.781
Yale	11	–	3	.786	21	–	11	.656
Princeton	11	–	3	.786	16	–	12	.571
Brown	8	–	6	.571	17	–	10	.630
Harvard	7	–	7	.500	14	–	12	.538
Columbia	4	–	10	.286	11	–	17	.393
Dartmouth	2	–	12	.143	9	–	18	.333
Cornell	2	–	12	.143	5	–	22	.185
Rankings from AP Poll

2001–02 MAAC men's basketball standings
	Conf.				Overall
Team	W		L	PCT	W		L	PCT
Rider	13	–	5	.722	17	–	11	.607
Marist	13	–	5	.722	19	–	9	.679
Manhattan	12	–	6	.667	20	–	9	.690
Niagara	12	–	6	.667	18	–	14	.563
Iona	10	–	8	.556	13	–	17	.433
Fairfield	9	–	9	.500	12	–	17	.414
Siena †	9	–	9	.500	17	–	19	.472
Canisius	5	–	13	.278	10	–	20	.333
Loyola (MD)	4	–	14	.222	5	–	23	.179
Saint Peter's	3	–	15	.167	4	–	24	.143
† 2002 MAAC tournament winner Rankings from AP Poll

2001–02 Mid-American Conference men's basketball standings
	Conf.				Overall
Team	W		L	PCT	W		L	PCT
East
Kent State†	17	–	1	.944	30	–	6	.833
Bowling Green	12	–	6	.667	24	–	9	.727
Ohio	11	–	7	.611	17	–	11	.607
Miami (OH)	9	–	9	.500	13	–	18	.419
Marshall	8	–	10	.444	15	–	15	.500
Buffalo	7	–	11	.389	12	–	18	.400
Akron	5	–	13	.278	10	–	21	.323
West
Ball State	12	–	6	.667	23	–	12	.657
Toledo	11	–	7	.611	16	–	14	.533
Western Michigan	10	–	8	.556	17	–	13	.567
Northern Illinois	8	–	10	.444	12	–	16	.429
Central Michigan	5	–	13	.278	9	–	19	.321
Eastern Michigan	2	–	16	.111	6	–	24	.200
† 2002 MAC tournament winner Rankings from AP Poll

2001–02 Mid-Continent Conference men's basketball standings
	Conf.				Overall
Team	W		L	PCT	W		L	PCT
Valparaiso †	12	–	2	.857	25	–	8	.758
Oral Roberts	10	–	4	.714	17	–	14	.548
Oakland	10	–	4	.714	17	–	13	.567
Southern Utah	8	–	6	.571	11	–	16	.407
UMKC	7	–	7	.500	18	–	11	.621
IUPUI	6	–	8	.429	15	–	15	.500
Western Illinois	3	–	11	.214	12	–	16	.429
Chicago State	0	–	14	.000	2	–	26	.071
† 2002 Mid-Con Tournament winner Rankings from AP Poll

2001–02 MEAC men's basketball standings
	Conf.				Overall
Team	W		L	PCT	W		L	PCT
Hampton †	17	–	1	.944	26	–	7	.788
Delaware State	12	–	6	.667	16	–	13	.552
Howard	11	–	7	.611	18	–	13	.581
South Carolina State	11	–	7	.611	15	–	16	.484
North Carolina A&T	10	–	8	.556	11	–	17	.393
Norfolk State	9	–	9	.500	10	–	19	.345
Florida A&M	9	–	9	.500	9	–	19	.321
Bethune–Cookman	8	–	10	.444	12	–	17	.414
Maryland Eastern Shore	7	–	11	.389	11	–	18	.379
Coppin State	3	–	15	.167	6	–	25	.194
Morgan State	2	–	16	.111	3	–	25	.107
† 2002 MEAC tournament winner Rankings from AP Poll

2001–02 Missouri Valley Conference men's basketball standings
	Conf.				Overall
Team	W		L	PCT	W		L	PCT
Southern Illinois	14	–	4	.778	28	–	8	.778
Creighton †	14	–	4	.778	23	–	9	.719
Illinois State	12	–	6	.667	17	–	14	.548
Southwest Missouri State	11	–	7	.611	17	–	15	.531
Wichita State	9	–	9	.500	15	–	15	.500
Drake	9	–	9	.500	14	–	15	.483
Northern Iowa	8	–	10	.444	14	–	15	.483
Bradley	5	–	13	.278	9	–	20	.310
Indiana State	4	–	14	.222	6	–	22	.214
Evansville	4	–	14	.222	7	–	21	.250
† 2002 MVC tournament winner Rankings from AP Poll

2001–02 Mountain West Conference men's basketball standings
	Conf.				Overall
Team	W		L	PCT	W		L	PCT
Wyoming	11	–	3	.786	22	–	9	.710
Utah	10	–	4	.714	21	–	9	.700
UNLV	9	–	5	.643	21	–	11	.656
BYU	7	–	7	.500	18	–	12	.600
San Diego State †	7	–	7	.500	21	–	12	.636
New Mexico	6	–	8	.429	16	–	14	.533
Colorado State	3	–	11	.214	12	–	18	.400
Air Force	3	–	11	.214	9	–	19	.321
† 2002 Mountain West tournament winner Rankings from AP Poll

2001–02 Northeast Conference men's basketball standings
	Conf.				Overall
Team	W		L	PCT	W		L	PCT
Central Connecticut †	19	–	1	.950	27	–	5	.844
Wagner	15	–	5	.750	19	–	10	.655
UMBC	15	–	5	.750	20	–	9	.690
Monmouth	14	–	6	.700	18	–	12	.600
St. Francis (NY)	13	–	7	.650	18	–	11	.621
Robert Morris	11	–	9	.550	12	–	18	.400
Quinnipiac	10	–	10	.500	14	–	16	.467
Sacred Heart	7	–	13	.350	8	–	20	.286
Saint Francis (PA)	5	–	15	.250	6	–	21	.222
Long Island	5	–	15	.250	5	–	22	.185
Fairleigh Dickinson	4	–	16	.200	4	–	25	.138
Mount St. Mary's	2	–	18	.100	3	–	24	.111
† 2002 NEC tournament winner

2001–02 Ohio Valley Conference men's basketball standings
	Conf.				Overall
Team	W		L	PCT	W		L	PCT
Tennessee Tech	15	–	1	.938	27	–	7	.794
Morehead State	11	–	5	.688	18	–	11	.621
Murray State †	10	–	6	.625	19	–	13	.594
Austin Peay	8	–	8	.500	14	–	18	.438
UT Martin	7	–	9	.438	15	–	14	.517
Eastern Illinois	7	–	9	.438	15	–	16	.484
Tennessee State	7	–	9	.438	11	–	17	.393
Southeast Missouri State	4	–	12	.250	6	–	22	.214
Eastern Kentucky	3	–	13	.188	7	–	20	.259
† 2002 OVC tournament winner Rankings from AP Poll

2001–02 Pacific-10 Conference men's basketball standings
	Conf.				Overall
Team	W		L	PCT	W		L	PCT
No. 6 Oregon	14	–	4	.778	26	–	9	.743
California	12	–	6	.667	23	–	9	.719
No. 10 Arizona†	12	–	6	.667	24	–	10	.706
No. 18 USC	12	–	6	.667	22	–	10	.688
Stanford	12	–	6	.667	20	–	10	.667
No. 20 UCLA	11	–	7	.611	21	–	12	.636
Arizona State	7	–	11	.389	12	–	15	.444
Washington	5	–	13	.278	11	–	17	.393
Oregon State	4	–	14	.222	11	–	17	.393
Washington State	1	–	17	.056	6	–	21	.222
† Conference tournament winner As of July 10, 2011; Rankings from Coaches Poll

2001–02 Patriot League men's basketball standings
	Conf.				Overall
Team	W		L	PCT	W		L	PCT
American	10	–	4	.714	18	–	12	.600
Holy Cross †	9	–	5	.643	18	–	15	.545
Bucknell	8	–	6	.571	13	–	16	.448
Colgate	8	–	6	.571	17	–	11	.607
Lafayette	8	–	6	.571	15	–	14	.517
Army	6	–	8	.429	12	–	16	.429
Navy	5	–	9	.357	10	–	20	.333
Lehigh	2	–	12	.143	5	–	23	.179
† 2002 Patriot League tournament winner

2001–02 Southeastern Conference men's basketball standings
	Conf.				Overall
Team	W		L	PCT	W		L	PCT
East
No. 15 Florida	10	–	6	.625	22	–	9	.710
No. 16 Kentucky	10	–	6	.625	22	–	10	.688
No. 23 Georgia	10	–	6	.625	22	–	10	.688
Tennessee	7	–	9	.438	15	–	16	.484
South Carolina	6	–	10	.375	22	–	15	.595
Vanderbilt	6	–	10	.375	17	–	15	.531
West
No. 8 Alabama	12	–	4	.750	27	–	8	.771
No. 17 Mississippi State †	10	–	6	.625	27	–	8	.771
Ole Miss	9	–	7	.563	20	–	11	.645
LSU	6	–	10	.375	19	–	15	.559
Arkansas	6	–	10	.375	14	–	15	.483
Auburn	4	–	12	.250	12	–	16	.429
† 2002 SEC tournament winner Rankings from AP Poll

2001–02 Southern Conference men's basketball standings
	Conf.				Overall
Team	W		L	PCT	W		L	PCT
North
Davidson †	11	–	5	.688	21	–	10	.677
East Tennessee State	11	–	5	.688	18	–	10	.643
UNC Greensboro	11	–	5	.688	20	–	11	.645
Western Carolina	6	–	10	.375	12	–	16	.429
VMI	5	–	11	.313	10	–	18	.357
Appalachian State	5	–	11	.313	10	–	18	.357
South
Georgia Southern	9	–	7	.563	16	–	12	.571
Chattanooga	9	–	7	.563	16	–	14	.533
College of Charleston	9	–	7	.563	21	–	9	.700
The Citadel	8	–	8	.500	17	–	12	.586
Furman	7	–	9	.438	17	–	14	.548
Wofford	5	–	11	.313	11	–	18	.379
† SoCon Tournament winner As of March 19, 2002; Rankings from AP Poll

2001–02 Southland Conference men's basketball standings
	Conf.				Overall
Team	W		L	PCT	W		L	PCT
McNeese State †	17	–	3	.850	21	–	9	.700
Louisiana–Monroe	15	–	5	.750	20	–	12	.625
UTSA	13	–	7	.650	19	–	10	.655
Lamar	11	–	9	.550	15	–	14	.517
Stephen F. Austin	10	–	10	.500	13	–	15	.464
Southwest Texas State	10	–	10	.500	12	–	16	.429
Sam Houston State	9	–	11	.450	14	–	14	.500
Texas–Arlington	9	–	11	.450	12	–	15	.444
Northwestern State	9	–	11	.450	13	–	18	.419
Southeastern Louisiana	6	–	14	.300	7	–	20	.259
Nicholls State	1	–	19	.050	2	–	25	.074
† 2002 Southland Conference tournament winner Rankings from AP Poll

2001–02 SWAC men's basketball standings
	Conf.				Overall
Team	W		L	PCT	W		L	PCT
Alcorn State †	16	–	2	.889	21	–	10	.677
Alabama A&M	12	–	6	.667	19	–	10	.655
Alabama State	12	–	6	.667	19	–	13	.594
Texas Southern	10	–	8	.556	11	–	17	.393
Mississippi Valley State	9	–	9	.500	12	–	17	.414
Prairie View A&M	8	–	10	.444	10	–	20	.333
Jackson State	8	–	10	.444	9	–	19	.321
Grambling State	7	–	11	.389	9	–	19	.321
Southern	6	–	12	.333	7	–	20	.259
Arkansas–Pine Bluff	2	–	16	.111	2	–	26	.071
† 2002 SWAC tournament winner Rankings from AP Poll

2001–02 Sun Belt Conference men's basketball standings
	Conf.				Overall
Team	W		L	PCT	W		L	PCT
East
No. 19 Western Kentucky †	13	–	1	.929	28	–	4	.875
Arkansas-Little Rock	8	–	6	.571	18	–	11	.621
Middle Tennessee	6	–	8	.429	14	–	15	.483
Arkansas State	5	–	9	.357	15	–	16	.484
Florida International	4	–	10	.286	10	–	20	.333
West
Louisiana–Lafayette	11	–	4	.733	20	–	11	.645
New Mexico State	11	–	4	.733	20	–	12	.625
New Orleans	9	–	6	.600	15	–	14	.517
North Texas	8	–	7	.533	15	–	14	.517
Denver	3	–	12	.200	8	–	20	.286
South Alabama	2	–	13	.133	7	–	21	.250
† 2002 Sun Belt Conference tournament winner Rankings from AP poll

2001–02 West Coast Conference men's basketball standings
	Conf.				Overall
Team	W		L	PCT	W		L	PCT
Pepperdine	13	–	1	.929	22	–	9	.710
No. 6 Gonzaga †	13	–	1	.929	29	–	4	.879
Santa Clara	8	–	6	.571	13	–	15	.464
San Francisco	8	–	6	.571	13	–	15	.464
San Diego	7	–	7	.500	16	–	13	.552
Saint Mary's	3	–	11	.214	9	–	20	.310
Loyola Marymount	2	–	12	.143	9	–	20	.310
Portland	2	–	12	.143	6	–	24	.200
† 2002 WCC tournament winner Rankings from AP Poll

2001–02 WAC men's basketball standings
	Conf.				Overall
Team	W		L	PCT	W		L	PCT
No. 25 Hawaii †	15	–	3	.833	27	–	6	.818
Tulsa	15	–	3	.833	27	–	7	.794
Louisiana Tech	14	–	4	.778	22	–	10	.688
SMU	10	–	8	.556	15	–	14	.517
Nevada	9	–	9	.500	17	–	13	.567
Fresno State	9	–	9	.500	19	–	15	.559
Boise State	6	–	12	.333	13	–	17	.433
Rice	5	–	13	.278	10	–	19	.345
San Jose State	4	–	14	.222	10	–	22	.313
UTEP	3	–	15	.167	10	–	22	.313
† 2002 WAC tournament winner Rankings from AP Poll

=== Division I independents ===
Three schools played as Division I independents. In addition, Birmingham-Southern, IPFW, and Lipscomb played as an independents as they began their transitions from NCAA Division II and the NAIA, but they were not considered full NCAA Division I schools until the following season.

2001–02 NCAA Division I men's basketball independents standings
	Conf.				Overall
Team	W		L	PCT	W		L	PCT
Texas–Pan American	-	–	-	–	20	–	10	.667
Centenary	-	–	-	–	14	–	13	.519
Morris Brown	-	–	-	–	5	–	24	.172
Rankings from AP Poll

=== Informal championships ===
Conference	Regular season winner	Most Valuable Player
Philadelphia Big 5	Penn	Lynn Greer, Temple

Penn finished with a 4–0 record in head-to-head competition among the Philadelphia Big 5.

=== Statistical leaders ===
Source for additional stats categories

Points per game			Rebounds per game			Assists per game			Steals per game		
Player	School	PPG	Player	School	RPG	Player	School	APG	Player	School	SPG
Jason Conley	VMI	29.3	Jeremy Bishop	Quinnipiac	12.0	T. J. Ford	Texas	8.3	Desmond Cambridge	Alabama A&M	5.5
Henry Domercant	E. Illinois	26.4	Bruce Jenkins	NC A&T	11.8	Steve Blake	Maryland	7.9	John Linehan	Providence	4.5
Mire Chatman	TX-Pan American	26.2	Curtis Borchardt	Stanford	11.4	Edward Scott	Clemson	7.9	Mire Chatman	TX-Pan American	3.6
J. R. Bremer	St. Bonaventure	24.6	Drew Gooden	Kansas	11.4	Sean Kennedy	Marist	7.9	Marques Green	St. Bonaventure	3.4
Melvin Ely	Fresno St.	23.3	Corey Jackson	Nevada	11.1	Chris Thomas	Notre Dame	7.6	Marcus Hatten	St. John's	3.3

Blocked shots per game			Field goal percentage			Three-point FG percentage			Free throw percentage		
Player	School	BPG	Player	School	FG%	Player	School	3FG%	Player	School	FT%
Wojciech Myrda	LA-Monroe	5.4	Adam Mark	Belmont	70.8	Dante Swanson	Tulsa	49.0	Cary Cochran	Nebraska	92.2
D'or Fischer	Northwestern St.	4.4	Carlos Boozer	Duke	66.5	Cain Doliboa	Wright St.	47.9	Gary Buchanan	Villanova	91.1
Emeka Okafor	UConn	4.1	David Harrison	Colorado	63.8	Jake Sullivan	Iowa St.	47.2	Cain Doliboa	Wright St.	90.9
Justin Rowe	Maine	4.0	Rolan Roberts	S. Illinois	60.4	Jeff Boschee	Kansas	46.4	Salim Stoudamire	Arizona	90.4
Deng Gai	Fairfield	4.0	Jermaine Hall	Wagner	60.0	Ray Abellard	C. Florida	46.2	Jake Sullivan	Iowa St.	90.0

== Post-season tournaments ==
=== NCAA tournament ===
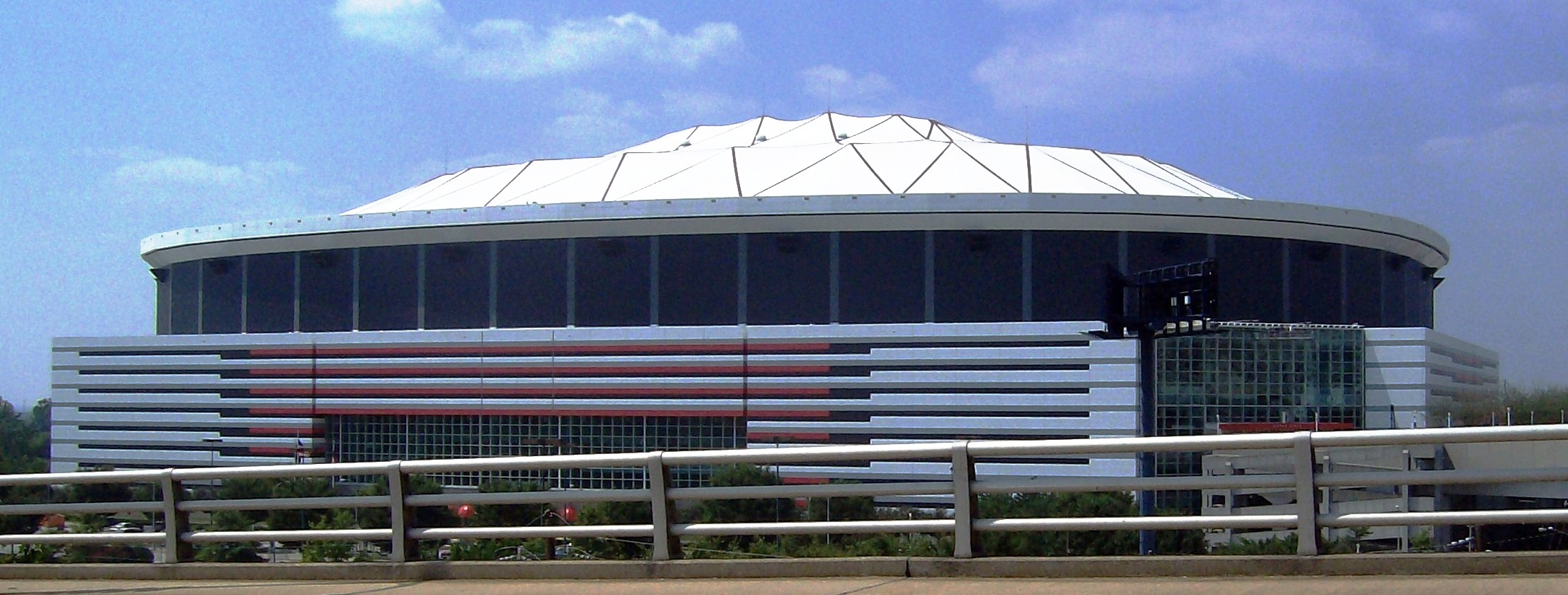
The Georgia Dome in Atlanta, Georgia was the site of the Final Four and Championship game to end the 2001–02 season.

==== Final Four – Georgia Dome, Atlanta, Georgia ====
National semifinals
E1	Maryland	97
M1	Kansas	88
S5	Indiana	73
W2	Oklahoma	64

National championship game
E1	Maryland	64
S5	Indiana	52

=== National Invitation tournament ===
==== Semifinals & finals ====
Semifinals
Syracuse	59
South Carolina	66
Temple	77
Memphis	79

Finals
South Carolina	62
Memphis	72
Third place
Syracuse	64
Temple	65

== Award winners ==
=== Consensus All-American teams ===
Consensus First Team
Player	Position	Class	Team
Dan Dickau	G	Senior	Gonzaga
Juan Dixon	G	Senior	Maryland
Drew Gooden	F	Junior	Kansas
Steve Logan	G	Senior	Cincinnati
Jason Williams	G	Junior	Duke

Consensus Second Team
Player	Position	Class	Team
Sam Clancy Jr.	F	Senior	Southern California
Mike Dunleavy Jr.	F	Junior	Duke
Casey Jacobsen	G/F	Junior	Stanford
Jared Jeffries	F	Sophomore	Indiana
David West	F	Junior	Xavier

=== Major player of the year awards ===
- Wooden Award: Jason Williams, Duke
- Naismith Award: Jason Williams, Duke
- Associated Press Player of the Year: Jason Williams, Duke
- NABC Player of the Year: Drew Gooden, Kansas & Jason Williams, Duke
- Oscar Robertson Trophy (USBWA): Jason Williams, Duke
- Adolph Rupp Trophy: Jason Williams, Duke
- Sporting News Player of the Year: Jason Williams, Duke

=== Major freshman of the year awards ===
- USBWA Freshman of the Year: T. J. Ford, Texas
- Sporting News Freshman of the Year: Maurice Williams, Alabama

=== Major coach of the year awards ===
- Associated Press Coach of the Year: Ben Howland, Pittsburgh
- Henry Iba Award (USBWA): Ben Howland, Pittsburgh
- NABC Coach of the Year: Kelvin Sampson, Oklahoma
- Naismith College Coach of the Year: Ben Howland, Pittsburgh
- CBS/Chevrolet Coach of the Year: Kelvin Sampson, Oklahoma
- Sporting News Coach of the Year: Ben Howland, Pittsburgh

=== Other major awards ===
- Pete Newell Big Man Award (Best big man): Drew Gooden, Kansas
- NABC Defensive Player of the Year: John Linehan, Providence
- Frances Pomeroy Naismith Award (Best player under 6'0): Steve Logan, Cincinnati
- Lowe's Senior CLASS Award (top senior): Juan Dixon, Maryland
- Robert V. Geasey Trophy (Top player in Philadelphia Big 5): Lynn Greer, Temple
- NIT/Haggerty Award (Top player in New York City metro area): Marcus Hatten, St. John's
- Chip Hilton Player of the Year Award (Strong personal character): Juan Dixon, Maryland

== Coaching changes ==
A number of teams changed coaches during the season and after it ended.

Team	Former Coach	Interim Coach	New Coach	Reason
Albany	Scott Beeten	Will Brown		
Arkansas	Nolan Richardson	Mike Anderson	Stan Heath	
Arkansas-Pine Bluff	Harold Blevins		Van Holt	
Army	Pat Harris		Jim Crews	
Bethune-Cookman	Horace Broadnax	Clifford Reed		
Boise State	Rod Jensen		Greg Graham	
Bradley	Jim Molinari		Jim Les	
Chattanooga	Henry Dickerson		Jeff Lebo	
College of Charleston	John Kresse		Tom Herrion	
DePaul	Pat Kennedy		Dave Leitao	
Evansville	Jim Crews		Steve Merfeld	
Florida State	Steve Robinson		Leonard Hamilton	
Fresno State	Jerry Tarkanian		Ray Lopes	
Green Bay	Mike Heideman		Tod Kowalczyk	
Hampton	Steve Merfeld		Bobby Collins	
Kent State	Stan Heath		Jim Christian	
Lehigh	Sal Mentesana		Billy Taylor	
Liberty	Mel Hankinson		Randy Dunton	
Long Beach State	Wayne Morgan		Larry Reynolds	
LIU Brooklyn	Ron Brown		Jim Ferry	
Middle Tennessee	Randy Wiel		Kermit Davis	
Montana	Don Holst		Pat Kennedy	
New Mexico	Fran Fraschilla		Ritchie McKay	
Nicholls	Rickey Broussard		Ricky Blanton	
Norfolk State	Wil Jones		Dwight Freeman	
Oregon State	Ritchie McKay		Jay John	
Portland State	Joel Sobotka		Heath Schroyer	
Prairie View A&M	Elwood Plummer		Jerry Francis	
Radford	Ron Bradley		Bryon Samuels	
Richmond	John Beilein		Jerry Wainwright	
Saint Louis	Lorenzo Romar		Brad Soderberg	
San Jose State	Steve Barnes		Phil Johnson	
South Alabama	Bob Weltlich		John Pelphrey	
TCU	Billy Tubbs		Neil Dougherty	
Tennessee Tech	Jeff Lebo		Mike Sutton	
UAB	Murry Bartow		Mike Anderson	
UNC Wilmington	Jerry Wainwright		Brad Brownell	
UTEP	Jason Rabedeaux		Billy Gillispie	
Valparaiso	Homer Drew		Scott Drew	
VCU	Mack McCarthy		Jeff Capel III	
Washington	Bob Bender		Lorenzo Romar	
West Virginia	Gale Catlett		John Beilein	
Wofford	Richard Johnson		Mike Young	
