= 2001–02 North Carolina Tar Heels men's basketball team =

American college basketball season

2001–02 North Carolina Tar Heels men's basketball
- Conference: Atlantic Coast Conference
- Record: 8–20 (4–12 ACC)
- Head coach: Matt Doherty (2nd season)
- Assistant coaches: Bob MacKinnon Jr. (2nd season); Fred Quartlebaum (2nd season); Doug Wojcik (2nd season)
- Captains: Jason Capel; Kris Lang
- Home arena: Dean Smith Center

2001–02 ACC men's basketball standings
	Conf.				Overall
Team	W		L	PCT	W		L	PCT
No. 4 Maryland	15	–	1	.938	32	–	4	.889
No. 1 Duke†	13	–	3	.813	31	–	4	.886
Wake Forest	9	–	7	.563	21	–	13	.618
NC State	9	–	7	.563	23	–	11	.676
Virginia	7	–	9	.438	17	–	12	.586
Georgia Tech	7	–	9	.438	15	–	16	.484
North Carolina	4	–	12	.250	8	–	20	.286
Florida State	4	–	12	.250	12	–	17	.414
Clemson	4	–	12	.250	13	–	17	.433
† 2002 ACC tournament winner Rankings from AP Poll

The 2001–02 North Carolina Tar Heels men's basketball team represented the University of North Carolina at Chapel Hill during the 2001–02 NCAA Division I men's basketball season. Their head coach was Matt Doherty. The team captains for this season were Jason Capel and Kris Lang. The team played its home games in the Dean Smith Center in Chapel Hill, North Carolina as a member of the Atlantic Coast Conference.

== Roster ==
2001–02 North Carolina Tar Heels men's basketball team
Players
Coaches

Pos.	#	Name	Height	Weight	Year	Previous school	Hometown
G	1	Melvin Scott	6 ft 2 in (1.88 m)	179 lb (81 kg)	Fr	Southern	Baltimore, Maryland
G	3	Brian Morrison	6 ft 2 in (1.88 m)	184 lb (83 kg)	So	Lake Washington	Redmond, Washington
G	5	Jackie Manuel	6 ft 5 in (1.96 m)	183 lb (83 kg)	Fr	Cardinal Newman	West Palm Beach, Florida
C	13	Neil Fingleton	7 ft 5 in (2.26 m)	285 lb (129 kg)	RS Fr	Holy Name	Durham, England
G	14	Jonathan Holmes	6 ft 0 in (1.83 m)	181 lb (82 kg)	Jr	Bloomington South	Bloomington, Indiana
F	21	Jawad Williams	6 ft 9 in (2.06 m)	200 lb (91 kg)	Fr	St. Edward	Cleveland, Ohio
G/F	25	Jason Capel (C)	6 ft 8 in (2.03 m)	237 lb (108 kg)	Sr	St. John's Prospect Hall	Fayetteville, North Carolina
F	30	Phillip McLamb	6 ft 6 in (1.98 m)	216 lb (98 kg)	So	Charlotte Country Day	Charlotte, North Carolina
G	31	Adam Boone	6 ft 2 in (1.88 m)	202 lb (92 kg)	So	Minnetonka	Minneapolis, Minnesota
F	32	Orlando Meléndez	6 ft 8 in (2.03 m)	192 lb (87 kg)	Sr	McDowell	Juana Díaz, Puerto Rico
F/C	42	Kris Lang (C)	6 ft 11 in (2.11 m)	247 lb (112 kg)	Sr	Hunter Huss	Gastonia, North Carolina
F	43	Joe Everett (W)	6 ft 8 in (2.03 m)	245 lb (111 kg)	Sr	Providence	Charlotte, North Carolina
F	44	Will Johnson (W)	6 ft 8 in (2.03 m)	218 lb (99 kg)	Jr	Hickory	Hickory, North Carolina
F/C	50	Brian Bersticker	6 ft 10 in (2.08 m)	238 lb (108 kg)	Jr	Kempsville	Virginia Beach, Virginia

Head coach

Matt Doherty

Assistant coach(es)

Doug Wojcik, Fred Quartlebaum, Bob MacKinnon

Legend

- (C) Team captain
- (S) Suspended
- (I) Ineligible
- (W) Walk-on
- Injured
- Current redshirt

Roster
Last update: March 25, 2017

Fingleton only played one game, against Davidson, before announcing he would transfer at the end of 2001. He later transferred to Holy Cross.

== Schedule and results ==
The Tar Heels started their regular season with three losses, the first time they had done so in 73 years. Their first regular season and conference win over Georgia Tech avoided the program's first 0-4 start in its history.

The Tar Heels were ranked number 19 in that season's preseason AP Poll. They fell out of the AP Poll after losing to Hampton. It would be the Tar Heels' only AP Poll ranking that season.

The 2001-02 season was also the first season the Tar Heels did not make it to the championship game of the Tournament of Champions presented by Hardee's in ten years, falling to Charleston in the second game. The Tar Heels did manage to upset Saint Joseph's, then ranked number 15 in the AP Poll, in the consolation game.

Prior to 2002, the largest margin of defeat against the Tar Heels in the Dean Smith Center was set in a 20-point loss against Duke in 1999. Kentucky, with 17 points, and NC State, with 18 points, nearly broke Duke's record, before Wake Forest succeeded with 22 points; Duke then reclaimed the record with a 29-point victory.

At the time, the away game at Cole Field House was the worst defeat in 79 years against Maryland, and the most points an opponent scored over the Tar Heels. The defeat also nearly matched the Tar Heels' worst defeat in their history with the Atlantic Coast Conference.

The home loss against NC State was also the worst home defeat to the Wolfpack since Dean Smith's first year as coach in 1962.

The Tar Heels matched their record for most losses in a season (15 losses in the 1950–51 and 1951-52 seasons) after their loss to Maryland at home. They would end the season with 20 losses, the most losses in the history of the program.

The Tar Heels ended their regular season at home with a 6-9 record, the worst home record in the history of the program.

In the 2002 ACC men's basketball tournament, the seventh-seeded Tar Heels were defeated by second-seeded Duke, who would go on to win that year's tournament.

Date time, TV	Rank^{#}	Opponent^{#}	Result	Record	High points	High rebounds	High assists	Site (attendance) city, state
October 25, 2001*; 7:30 pm		Blue-White Game; Scrimmage						Dean Smith Center; Chapel Hill, NC
November 4, 2001*; 1:00 pm		EA Sports All-Stars; Exhibition game	L 76 - 107	0-0	34 – Lang	8 – Tied	8 – Morrison	Dean Smith Center (5,038); Chapel Hill, NC
November 10, 2001*; 4:30 pm	No. 19	Nike Elite; Exhibition game	W 81 - 70	0-0	27 – Lang	15 – Johnson	5 – Boone	Dean Smith Center (7,528); Chapel Hill, NC
November 16, 2001*; 7:30 pm	No. 19	Hampton	L 69-77	0-1	17 – Capel	11 – Capel	5 – Tied	Dean Smith Center (17,320); Chapel Hill, NC
November 20, 2001*; 7:00 pm, RSN		Davidson	L 54-58	0-2	15 – Scott	11 – Capel	5 – Capel	Dean Smith Center (14,705); Chapel Hill, NC
November 28, 2001*; 9:00 pm, ESPN		Indiana; ACC–Big Ten Challenge	L 66-79	0-3	27 – Lang	9 – Capel	5 – Scott	Dean Smith Center (18,358); Chapel Hill, NC
December 2, 2001; 6:00, RSN		Georgia Tech	W 83-77	1-3 (1-0)	21 – Morrison	13 – Lang	5 – Tied	Dean Smith Center (17,492); Chapel Hill, NC
December 8, 2001*; 4:00 pm, CBS		at No. 11 Kentucky; Rivalry	L 59-79	1-4	18 – Lang	12 – Capel	4 – Morrison	Rupp Arena (23,153); Lexington, KY
December 16, 2001*; 1:00 pm, RJ		Binghamton	W 61-60	2-4	12 – Williams	10 – Capel	6 – Capel	Dean Smith Center (12,132); Chapel Hill, NC
December 21, 2001*; 9:15 pm, RJ		vs. Charleston; Tournament of Champions	L 60-66	2-5	14 – Tied	10 – Capel	4 – Capel	Cricket Arena (9,713); Charlotte, NC
December 22, 2001*; 7:00 pm, RJ		vs. No. 15 Saint Joseph's; Tournament of Champions	W 92-76	3-5	21 – Capel	16 – Capel	5 – Morrison	Cricket Arena (5,115); Charlotte, NC
December 27, 2001*; 7:30 pm		North Carolina A&T	W 104-66	4-5	26 – Capel	9 – Bersticker	5 – Tied	Dean Smith Center (15,150); Chapel Hill, NC
December 30, 2001*; 8:00 pm, RSN		Texas A&M	W 96-62	5-5	22 – Capel	16 – Capel	6 – Tied	Dean Smith Center (15,676); Chapel Hill, NC
January 5, 2002; 4:00 pm, ESPN		No. 23 Wake Forest	L 62-84	5-6 (1-1)	13 – Capel	9 – Capel	4 – Boone	Dean Smith Center (21,293); Chapel Hill, NC
January 9, 2002; 7:30 pm, ESPN2		at No. 4 Maryland	L 79-112	5-7 (1-2)	27 – Capel	7 – Lang	5 – Tied	Cole Field House (14,500); College Park, MD
January 12, 2002; 12:00 pm, ESPN		No. 7 Virginia	L 67-71	5-8 (1-3)	18 – Lang	7 – Manuel	5 – Capel	Dean Smith Center (20,079); Chapel Hill, NC
January 16, 2002; 7:00 pm, ESPN2		at Florida State	L 71-81	5-9 (1-4)	23 – Lang	8 – Lang	4 – Manuel	Tallahassee Civic Center (7,523); Tallahassee, FL
January 19, 2002*; 4:00 pm, CBS		at Connecticut	L 54-86	5-10	15 – Lang	8 – Williams	3 – Boone	Gampel Pavilion (10,027); Storrs, CT
January 23, 2002; 9:00 pm, RJ		NC State; Carolina–State Game	L 59-77	5-11 (1-5)	27 – Lang	7 – Williams	6 – Morrison	Dean Smith Center (21,750); Chapel Hill, NC
January 27, 2002; 6:00 pm, RSN		at Clemson	W 87-69	6-11 (2-5)	23 – Boone	10 – Boone	4 – Tied	Littlejohn Coliseum (10,000); Clemson, SC
January 31, 2002; 9:00 pm, ESPN		No. 1 Duke; Carolina–Duke rivalry	L 58-87	6-12 (2-6)	12 – Morrison	5 – Manuel	4 – Morrison	Dean Smith Center (21,750); Chapel Hill, NC
February 2, 2002; 1:00 pm, CBS		at Georgia Tech	L 74-86	6-13 (2-7)	21 – Capel	13 – Lang	7 – Boone	Alexander Memorial Coliseum (6,550); Atlanta, GA
February 6, 2002; 9:00 pm, RJ		at No. 19 Wake Forest	L 66-90	6-14 (2-8)	13 – Morrison	8 – Lang	4 – Capel	LJVM Coliseum (13,523); Winston-Salem, NC
February 10, 2002; 6:30 pm, RSN		No. 3 Maryland	L 77-92	6-15 (2-9)	23 – Lang	11 – Williams	5 – Tied	Dean Smith Center (18,751); Chapel Hill, NC
February 12, 2002; 8:00 pm, RJ		at No. 15 Virginia	L 63-73	6-16 (2-10)	19 – Lang	9 – Capel	4 – Boone	University Hall (7,331); Charlottesville, VA
February 17, 2002; 3:00 pm, RJ		Florida State	W 95-85	7-16 (3-10)	28 – Boone	8 – Capel	6 – Boone	Dean Smith Center (17,055); Chapel Hill, NC
February 20, 2002*; 7:30 pm, ESPN2		Ohio	L 78-86	7-17	17 – Scott	6 – Manuel	7 – Boone	Dean Smith Center (13,252); Chapel Hill, NC
February 24, 2002; 6:30 pm, RSN		at NC State; Carolina–State Game	L 76-98	7-18 (3-11)	19 – Lang	10 – Williams	5 – Boone	Raleigh ESA (19,722); Raleigh, NC
February 27, 2002; 9:00 pm, RJ		Clemson	W 96-78	8-18	28 – Capel	5 – Tied	8 – Boone	Dean Smith Center (16,125); Chapel Hill, NC
March 3, 2002; 3:30 pm, ABC		at No. 3 Duke; Carolina–Duke rivalry	L 68-93	8-19 (4-12)	20 – Capel	9 – Capel	8 – Boone	Cameron Indoor Stadium (9,314); Durham, NC
ACC Tournament
March 8, 2002; 7:00 pm, ESPN	(7)	vs. (2) No. 3 Duke; Quarterfinals/Rivalry	L 48-60	8-20	14 – Lang	12 – Capel	4 – Capel	Charlotte Coliseum (23,895); Charlotte, NC
*Non-conference game. ^{#}Rankings from AP Poll. (#) Tournament seedings in parentheses. All times are in EST.
