= 2002 NCAA Division I men's basketball championship game =

American college basketball final

2002 NCAA Tournament Championship Game
National championship game
| Indiana Hoosiers | Maryland Terrapins |
| Big Ten | ACC |
| (25–11) | (31–4) |
|---|---|
| 52 | 64 |
| Head coach: Mike Davis | Head coach: Gary Williams |
- AP: 23
- Coaches: NR
- AP: 4
- Coaches: 4
| | 1st half | 2nd half | Total |
|---|---|---|---|
| Indiana Hoosiers | 25 | 27 | 52 |
| Maryland Terrapins | 31 | 33 | 64 |
- Date: April 1, 2002
- Venue: Georgia Dome, Atlanta, Georgia
- MVP: Juan Dixon, Maryland
- Favorite: Maryland by 7.5
- Referees: Jim Burr, Richard Cartmell, Tony Greene
- Attendance: 53,406
- National anthem: Maryland Pep Band

United States TV coverage
- Network: CBS
- Announcers: Jim Nantz (play-by-play); Billy Packer (color); Bonnie Bernstein and Armen Keteyian (sideline)

The 2002 NCAA Division I men's basketball championship game was the finals of the 2002 NCAA Division I men's basketball tournament and it determined the national champion for the 2001-02 NCAA Division I men's basketball season The game was played on April 1, 2002, at the Georgia Dome in Atlanta, Georgia and featured the 2002 East Regional Champion, #1-seeded Maryland versus the South Regional Champion, #5-seeded Indiana.

The Terrapins defeated the Hoosiers to win their first (and to date, only) national championship in school history. The victory by the Terrapins was also Indiana’s first defeat in the national championship game, ending a five-game streak that dated back to their first national championship in 1940.

== Starting lineups ==
| Indiana | Position | Maryland |
|---|---|---|
| Tom Coverdale | G | Steve Blake |
| Dane Fife | G | † Juan Dixon |
| Jared Jeffries | F | Byron Mouton |
| Jarrad Odle | F | Chris Wilcox |
| Kyle Hornsby | F/C | Lonny Baxter |
† 2002 Consensus First Team All-American

== Game summary ==
The Maryland Terrapins completed the task they set out to do one year earlier by defeating the Indiana Hoosiers, 64–52. Maryland led virtually the entire game except for a brief point with 9:50 left in the basketball game when Indiana took a 44–42 lead. Maryland answered the Hoosier run and ended the game with a 22–8 run to bring home the school's first and coach Gary Williams' only men's basketball National Championship. Senior Juan Dixon was named the tournament's Most Outstanding Player (MOP).

== Aftermath ==
Each team has not reached the NCAA championship game since the end of this game. Each have also not made it past the Sweet Sixteen since 2002; Davis was let go after the 2005–06 season.

On November 19, 2012, Maryland would join the Big Ten Conference, becoming the 13th member to join the conference. Since Indiana was already in the Big Ten Conference, the two teams would later become conference foes and end up facing each other at least once every year.

External videos
- Full game broadcast by CBS on YouTube
