= 2001 Maui Invitational =

Maui Invitational Tournament
- Season: 2001–02
- Teams: 8
- Finals site: Lahaina Civic Center; Maui, Hawaii
- Champions: Duke (3rd title)
- Runner-up: Ball State (1st title game)
- Semifinalists: South Carolina; UCLA
- Winning coach: Mike Krzyzewski (3rd title)
- Mike Dunleavy (Duke)

The 2001 Maui Invitational Tournament was an early-season college basketball tournament that was played, for the 18th time, from November 19 to November 21, 2001. The tournament, which began in 1984, was part of the 2001–02 NCAA Division I men's basketball season. The tournament was played at the Lahaina Civic Center in Maui, Hawaii and was won by the Duke Blue Devils. It was the third title for both the program and for its head coach Mike Krzyzewski.

== Bracket ==
Fifth Place Game; November 21
Seton Hall	62
4	Kansas	80
Seventh Place Game
Chaminade	73
Houston	76

Consolation 2nd Round; November 20
Chaminade	62
Seton Hall	74
Houston	78
4	Kansas	95

First round November 19
Chaminade	61
South Carolina	74
1	Duke	80
Seton Hall	79
5	UCLA	71
Houston	60
7	Kansas	91
Ball State	93

Semifinals; November 20
South Carolina	56
1	Duke	81
5	UCLA	73
Ball State	91

Championship; November 21
1	Duke	83
Ball State	71
Third-place game
3	UCLA	89
South Carolina	77
