= 2001–02 Atlantic Coast Conference men's basketball season =

== Final standings ==
Team	ACC Regular Season	ACC %	ACC Home	ACC Road	All Games	All Games %	All Home	All Road	All Neutral
Maryland	15–1	.938	8–0	7–1	32–4	.889	15–0	7–2	10–2
Duke	13–3	.813	8–0	5–3	31–4	.886	13–0	7–3	11–1
Wake Forest	9–7	.563	6–2	3–5	21–13	.618	13–3	5–7	3–3
North Carolina State	9–7	.563	5–3	4–4	23–11	.676	14–4	6–5	3–2
Virginia	7–9	.563	5–3	2–6	17–12	.586	13–4	3–7	1–1
Georgia Tech	7–9	.437	4–4	3–5	15–16	.484	8–7	4–6	3–3
North Carolina	4–12	.250	3–5	1–7	8–20	.286	6–9	1–9	1–1
Florida State	4–12	.250	4–4	0–8	12–17	.414	10–6	1–10	1–1
Clemson	4–12	.250	3–5	1–7	13–17	.430	8–8	2–7	3–2

== ACC tournament ==
See 2002 ACC men's basketball tournament

== Postseason ==
=== NCAA tournament ===
ACC Record: 10–3

1 Maryland (6–0) – National Champions

W 16 Siena 85–70
W 8 Wisconsin 87–57
W 4 Kentucky 78–68
W 2 Connecticut 90–82
W 1 Kansas 97–88
W 5 Indiana 64–52

1 Duke (2–1) – Sweet Sixteen

W 16 Winthrop 84–37
W 8 Notre Dame 84–77
L 5 Indiana 73–74

7 NC State (1–1)

W 10 Michigan State 69–58
L 2 Connecticut 74–77

7 Wake Forest (1–1)

W 10 Pepperdine 83–74
L 2 Oregon 87–92

=== NIT ===
ACC Record: 0–1

Virginia (0–1)

L South Carolina 67–74
