= 2001–02 Virginia Cavaliers men's basketball team =

American college basketball season

2001–02 Virginia Cavaliers men's basketball

NIT, First Round
- Conference: Atlantic Coast Conference
- Record: 17–12 (7–9 ACC)
- Head coach: Pete Gillen (4th season)
- Assistant coaches: Tom Herrion (4th season); Walt Fuller (4th season); Scott Shepherd (3rd season)
- Home arena: University Hall

2001–02 ACC men's basketball standings
| | Conf. | | | | Overall |
| Team | W | | L | PCT | W | | L | PCT |
|---|---|---|---|---|---|---|---|---|
| No. 4 Maryland | 15 | – | 1 | .938 | 32 | – | 4 | .889 |
| No. 1 Duke† | 13 | – | 3 | .813 | 31 | – | 4 | .886 |
| Wake Forest | 9 | – | 7 | .563 | 21 | – | 13 | .618 |
| NC State | 9 | – | 7 | .563 | 23 | – | 11 | .676 |
| Virginia | 7 | – | 9 | .438 | 17 | – | 12 | .586 |
| Georgia Tech | 7 | – | 9 | .438 | 15 | – | 16 | .484 |
| North Carolina | 4 | – | 12 | .250 | 8 | – | 20 | .286 |
| Florida State | 4 | – | 12 | .250 | 12 | – | 17 | .414 |
| Clemson | 4 | – | 12 | .250 | 13 | – | 17 | .433 |
† 2002 ACC tournament winner Rankings from AP Poll

The 2001–02 Virginia Cavaliers men's basketball team represented the University of Virginia during the 2001–02 NCAA Division I men's basketball season. The team was led by fourth-year head coach Pete Gillen, and played their home games at University Hall in Charlottesville, Virginia as members of the Atlantic Coast Conference.

== Last season ==
The Cavaliers had a record of 17–12, with a conference record of 7–9. They competed in the 2002 NIT Tournament, where they lost in the first round to South Carolina.

== Roster ==
2001–02 Virginia Cavaliers men's basketball team
Players
Coaches

| Pos. | # | Name | Height | Weight | Year | Previous school | Hometown |
|---|---|---|---|---|---|---|---|
| C | 4 | Nick VanderLaan (redshirt) | 6 ft 10 in (2.08 m) | 249 lb (113 kg) | Jr | St. Thomas More | Sacramento, California |
| G | 5 | Jason Dowling | 6 ft 3 in (1.91 m) | 202 lb (92 kg) | Sr | Xaverian HS | Brooklyn, New York |
| G | 10 | Keith Jenifer | 6 ft 3 in (1.91 m) | 155 lb (70 kg) | Fr | Towson Catholic HS/Hargrave Military | Baltimore |
| G | 11 | Majestic Mapp | 6 ft 2 in (1.88 m) | 184 lb (83 kg) | RS So | St. Raymond HS | Harlem, New York |
| G | 12 | Bret Gladstone | 6 ft 1 in (1.85 m) | 171 lb (78 kg) | Fr | Brunswick School | Greenwich, Connecticut |
| G | 21 | Roger Mason, Jr. (C) | 6 ft 5 in (1.96 m) | 199 lb (90 kg) | Jr | Good Counsel HS | Silver Spring, Maryland |
| G | 22 | Todd Billet (redshirt) | 6 ft 0 in (1.83 m) | 183 lb (83 kg) | Jr | Christian Brothers | Middletown, New Jersey |
| G | 24 | Jermaine Harper | 6 ft 3 in (1.91 m) | 166 lb (75 kg) | Fr | Blue Ridge | Gardena, California |
| F/C | 30 | Jason Rogers | 6 ft 11 in (2.11 m) | 231 lb (105 kg) | Jr | Robert E. Lee HS | Staunton, Virginia |
| G/F | 31 | Adam Hall (C) | 6 ft 5 in (1.96 m) | 203 lb (92 kg) | Sr | Katy HS | Katy, Texas |
| F | 32 | J.C. Mathis | 6 ft 8 in (2.03 m) | 224 lb (102 kg) | So | John F. Kennedy HS | Brooklyn, New York |
| F | 33 | Chris Williams (C) | 6 ft 7 in (2.01 m) | 216 lb (98 kg) | Sr | Minor HS | Birmingham, Alabama |
| F | 34 | Jason Clark | 6 ft 8 in (2.03 m) | 225 lb (102 kg) | Fr | Hargrave Military | Virginia Beach, Virginia |
| F/C | 35 | Travis Watson | 6 ft 8 in (2.03 m) | 255 lb (116 kg) | Jr | Oak Hill | Brookneal, Virginia |
| F | 42 | Elton Brown | 6 ft 9 in (2.06 m) | 265 lb (120 kg) | Fr | Warwick HS | Newport News, Virginia |

Head coach

- Pete Gillen (Fairfield)

Assistant coach(es)

- Tom Herrion (Merrimack)
- Walt Fuller (Drexel)
- Scott Shepherd (Robert Morris)

Legend

- (C) Team captain
- (S) Suspended
- (I) Ineligible
- (W) Walk-on
- Injured
- Current redshirt

Roster
Last update: 6 January 2015

== Schedule ==
The Nov. 28, 2001 game between Michigan State and Virginia was cancelled with 15:04 in the second half, due to a wet floor at the Richmond Coliseum. When the game was called, Virginia led 31–28. Two days after the game, Virginia athletic director Craig Littlepage announced that the game would not be finished or restarted.

| Date time, TV | Rank^{#} | Opponent^{#} | Result | Record | Site (attendance) city, state |
Exhibition games
| Nov. 2*; 7:30 pm | No. 11 | Nantucket Nectars | W 82–70 | | University Hall; Charlottesville, Virginia |
| Nov. 11; 2:00 pm | No. 11 | Los Angeles Stars | W 98–69 | | University Hall; Charlottesville, Virginia |
Regular season
| Nov. 16*; 7:30 pm | No. 11 | Wagner | W 105–74 | 1–0 | University Hall (8,199); Charlottesville, Virginia |
| Nov. 18*; 2:00 pm | No. 11 | East Tennessee State | W 85–62 | 2–0 | University Hall (7,141); Charlottesville, Virginia |
| Nov. 21*; 7:30 pm | No. 11 | Howard | W 115–66 | 3–0 | University Hall (7,701); Charlottesville, Virginia |
| Nov. 28*; 7:30 pm, ESPN2 | No. 11 | vs. No. 22 Michigan State; ACC–Big Ten Challenge | | | Richmond Coliseum (11,666); Richmond, Virginia |
| Dec. 1*; 7:00 pm, FSN South | No. 9 | Virginia Tech | W 69–61 | 4–0 | University Hall (8,392); Charlottesville, Virginia |
| Dec. 8*; 4:30 pm | No. 8 | vs. Auburn | W 77–72 | 5–0 | BJCC Arena (8,178); Birmingham, Alabama |
| Dec. 17*; 7:30 pm, ESPN Regional | No. 5 | Charleston Southern | W 74–54 | 6–0 | University Hall (8,392); Charlottesville, Virginia |
| Dec. 20*; 8:00 pm, TBS | No. 5 | at No. 16 Georgetown; John Thompson Classic | W 61–55 | 7–0 | MCI Center (18,789); Washington, D.C. |
| Dec. 23*; 6:00 pm, FSN | No. 5 | Rutgers | W 76–68 | 8–0 | University Hall (8,392); Charlottesville, Virginia |
| Dec. 30*; 2:00 pm | No. 4 | Grambling State | W 112–67 | 9–0 | University Hall (8,273); Charlottesville, Virginia |
| Jan. 5; 2:00 pm, Raycom | No. 4 | NC State | L 74–81 | 9–1 (0–1) | University Hall (8,392); Charlottesville, Virginia |
| Jan. 8; 7:00 pm, FSN South | No. 7 | at Clemson | L 52–68 | 9–2 (0–2) | Littlejohn Coliseum (8,500); Clemson, South Carolina |
| Jan. 12; 12:00 pm, ESPN | No. 7 | at North Carolina | W 71–67 | 10–2 (1–2) | Dean Smith Center (20,079); Chapel Hill, North Carolina |
| Jan. 15; 9:00 pm, Raycom | No. 10 | No. 14 Wake Forest | W 86–74 | 11–2 (2–2) | University Hall (8,392); Charlottesville, Virginia |
| Jan. 20; 4:00 pm, Raycom | No. 10 | Florida State | W 91–74 | 12–2 (3–2) | University Hall (7,524); Charlottesville, Virginia |
| Jan. 22; 7:30 pm, ESPN2 | No. 7 | at Georgia Tech | W 69–65 | 13–2 (4–2) | Alexander Memorial Coliseum (6,287); Atlanta |
| Jan. 24*; 7:30 pm | No. 7 | VMI | W 93–59 | 14–2 (4–2) | University Hall (7,886); Charlottesville, Virginia |
| Jan. 27; 8:00 pm, FSN | No. 7 | at No. 1 Duke | L 81–94 | 14–3 (4–3) | Cameron Indoor Stadium (9,314); Durham, North Carolina |
| Jan. 31; 7:00 pm, ESPN2 | No. 8 | No. 3 Maryland | L 87–91 | 14–4 (4–4) | University Hall (8,392); Charlottesville, Virginia |
| Feb. 3*; 2:00 pm, ABC | No. 8 | at No. 22 Missouri | L 77–81 | 14–5 (4–4) | Hearnes Center (12,136); Columbia, Missouri |
| Feb. 6; 7:30 pm, ESPN2 | No. 10 | at NC State | L 68–85 | 14–6 (4–5) | Raleigh Entertainment & Sports Arena (16,729); Raleigh, North Carolina |
| Feb. 10; 3:30 pm, Raycom | No. 10 | Clemson | W 85–71 | 15–6 (5–5) | University Hall (7,438); Charlottesville, Virginia |
| Feb. 12; 8:00 pm, Raycom | No. 15 | North Carolina | W 73–63 | 16–6 (6–5) | University Hall (7,331); Charlottesville, Virginia |
| Feb. 17; 6:30 pm, FSN | No. 15 | at No. 19 Wake Forest | L 70–92 | 16–7 (6–6) | LJVM Coliseum (12,859); Winston-Salem, North Carolina |
| Feb. 20; 7:00 pm | No. 22 | at Florida State | L 59–66 | 16–8 (6–7) | Tallahassee–Leon County Civic Center (4,681); Tallahassee, Florida |
| Feb. 23; 4:00 pm, Raycom | No. 22 | Georgia Tech | L 80–82 | 16–9 (6–8) | University Hall (8,392); Charlottesville, Virginia |
| Feb. 28; 9:00 pm, ESPN | | No. 3 Duke | W 87–84 | 17–9 (7–8) | University Hall (8,392); Charlottesville, Virginia |
| Mar. 3; 8:00 pm, FSN | | at No. 2 Maryland | L 92–112 | 17–10 (7–9) | Cole Field House (14,500); College Park, Maryland |
ACC Tournament
| Mar. 8; 2:35 pm, Raycom/ESPN | | vs. NC State; ACC Quarterfinals | L 72–92 | 17–11 | Charlotte Coliseum (23,895); Charlotte, North Carolina |
National Invitation Tournament
| Mar. 13*; 7:30 pm, ESPN2 | | South Carolina; NIT First Round | L 67–74 | 17–12 | University Hall (4,983); Charlottesville, Virginia |
*Non-conference game. (#) Tournament seedings in parentheses. All times are in Eastern Time.
