= 2001–02 NC State Wolfpack men's basketball team =

American college basketball season

2001–02 NC State Wolfpack men's basketball

NCAA tournament, second round
- Conference: Atlantic Coast Conference

Ranking
- Coaches: No. 25
- Record: 23–11 (9–7 ACC)
- Head coach: Herb Sendek (6th season)
- Home arena: RBC Center

2001–02 ACC men's basketball standings
| | Conf. | | | | Overall |
| Team | W | | L | PCT | W | | L | PCT |
|---|---|---|---|---|---|---|---|---|
| No. 4 Maryland | 15 | – | 1 | .938 | 32 | – | 4 | .889 |
| No. 1 Duke† | 13 | – | 3 | .813 | 31 | – | 4 | .886 |
| Wake Forest | 9 | – | 7 | .563 | 21 | – | 13 | .618 |
| NC State | 9 | – | 7 | .563 | 23 | – | 11 | .676 |
| Virginia | 7 | – | 9 | .438 | 17 | – | 12 | .586 |
| Georgia Tech | 7 | – | 9 | .438 | 15 | – | 16 | .484 |
| North Carolina | 4 | – | 12 | .250 | 8 | – | 20 | .286 |
| Florida State | 4 | – | 12 | .250 | 12 | – | 17 | .414 |
| Clemson | 4 | – | 12 | .250 | 13 | – | 17 | .433 |
† 2002 ACC tournament winner Rankings from AP Poll

The 2001–02 NC State Wolfpack men's basketball team represented North Carolina State University as a member of the Atlantic Coast Conference during the 2001–02 men's college basketball season. It was Herb Sendek's sixth season as head coach. The Wolfpack earned a bid to the NCAA tournament, reached the second round, and finished with a record of 23–11 (9–7 ACC).

== Roster ==
2001–02 NC State Wolfpack men's basketball team
Players
Coaches

| Pos. | # | Name | Height | Weight | Year | Hometown |
|---|---|---|---|---|---|---|
| G | 2 | Anthony Grundy | 6 ft 3 in (1.91 m) | 180 lb (82 kg) | Sr | Louisville, Kentucky |
| F | 3 | Ilian Evtimov | 6 ft 7 in (2.01 m) | 220 lb (100 kg) | Fr | Winston-Salem, North Carolina |
| G | 11 | Archie Miller | 5 ft 11 in (1.8 m) | 160 lb (73 kg) | Sr | Beaver Falls, Pennsylvania |
| G | 24 | Julius Hodge | 6 ft 7 in (2.01 m) | 210 lb (95 kg) | Fr |
| F | 33 | Josh Powell | 6 ft 9 in (2.06 m) | 225 lb (102 kg) | Fr |
| F | 54 | Marcus Melvin | 6 ft 8 in (2.03 m) | 230 lb (104 kg) | So | Fayetteville, North Carolina |

Head coach

- Herb Sendek (Carnegie Mellon)

Assistant coach(es)

Legend

- (C) Team captain
- (S) Suspended
- (I) Ineligible
- (W) Walk-on
- Injured
- Current redshirt

== Schedule and results ==
| Date time, TV | Rank^{#} | Opponent^{#} | Result | Record | Site city, state |
Regular Season
| Nov 27, 2001* | | at Ohio State | L 50–64 | 5–1 | Value City Arena; Columbus, Ohio |
| Dec 8, 2001* | | at No. 9 Syracuse | W 82–68 | 7–2 | Carrier Dome; Syracuse, New York |
ACC Tournament
| Mar 8, 2002* | | vs. Virginia; Quarterfinals | W 92–72 | 21–9 | Charlotte Coliseum; Charlotte, North Carolina |
| Mar 9, 2002* | | vs. No. 2 Maryland; Semifinals | W 86–82 | 22–9 | Charlotte Coliseum; Charlotte, North Carolina |
| Mar 10, 2002* | | vs. No. 3 Duke; Championship game | L 61–91 | 22–10 | Charlotte Coliseum; Charlotte, North Carolina |
NCAA Tournament
| Mar 15, 2002* | | vs. Michigan State; First Round | W 69–58 | 23–10 | Verizon Center; Washington, D.C. |
| Mar 17, 2002* | | vs. No. 10 Connecticut; Second Round | L 74–77 | 23–11 | Verizon Center; Washington, D.C. |
*Non-conference game. ^{#}Rankings from AP Poll. (#) Tournament seedings in parentheses. E=East. All times are in Eastern Time.
