= 2001–02 Wake Forest Demon Deacons men's basketball team =

American college basketball season

2001–02 Wake Forest Demon Deacons men's basketball

NCAA tournament, second round
- Conference: Atlantic Coast Conference
- Record: 21–13 (9–7 ACC)
- Head coach: Skip Prosser (1st season)
- Assistant coach: Dino Gaudio (1st season)
- Home arena: LJVM Coliseum

2001–02 ACC men's basketball standings
	Conf.				Overall
Team	W		L	PCT	W		L	PCT
No. 4 Maryland	15	–	1	.938	32	–	4	.889
No. 1 Duke†	13	–	3	.813	31	–	4	.886
Wake Forest	9	–	7	.563	21	–	13	.618
NC State	9	–	7	.563	23	–	11	.676
Virginia	7	–	9	.438	17	–	12	.586
Georgia Tech	7	–	9	.438	15	–	16	.484
North Carolina	4	–	12	.250	8	–	20	.286
Florida State	4	–	12	.250	12	–	17	.414
Clemson	4	–	12	.250	13	–	17	.433
† 2002 ACC tournament winner Rankings from AP Poll

The 2001–02 Wake Forest Demon Deacons men's basketball team represented Wake Forest University as a member of the Atlantic Coast Conference during the 2001–02 NCAA Division I men's basketball season. Led by head coach Skip Prosser, the team played their home games at Lawrence Joel Veterans Memorial Coliseum in Winston-Salem, North Carolina. The Demon Deacons finished tied for third in the ACC regular season standings. They lost to Duke in the semifinals of the ACC Tournament. Wake Forest received an at-large bid to the NCAA tournament as the No. 7 seed in the Midwest region. After a win over Pepperdine in the opening round, the Deacons were beaten by No. 2 seed Oregon in the second round to end the season with a record of 21–13 (9–7 ACC).

== Roster ==
2001–02 Wake Forest Demon Deacons men's basketball team
Players
Coaches

Pos.	#	Name	Height	Weight	Year	Previous school	Hometown
F	5	Josh Howard (C)	6 ft 7 in (2.01 m)	205 lb (93 kg)	Jr	Hargrave Military Academy	Winston-Salem, North Carolina
F	25	Darius Songaila	6 ft 9 in (2.06 m)	248 lb (112 kg)	Sr

Head coach

- Skip Prosser

Assistant coach(es)

- Dino Gaudio

Legend

- (C) Team captain
- (S) Suspended
- (I) Ineligible
- (W) Walk-on
- Injured
- Current redshirt

Roster

== Schedule and results ==
Date time, TV	Rank^{#}	Opponent^{#}	Result	Record	Site city, state
Regular Season
Nov 12, 2001*		UNC Wilmington	W 79–78	1–0	Lawrence Joel Coliseum; Winston-Salem, North Carolina
Nov 16, 2001*; 7:00 p.m., ESPN		at Arkansas; Pre-Season NIT	W 76–71	2–0	Bud Walton Arena (17,820); Fayetteville, Arkansas
Nov 18, 2001*		Elon	W 87–67	3–0	Lawrence Joel Coliseum; Winston-Salem, North Carolina
Nov 21, 2001*		vs. No. 23 Fresno State; Preseason NIT	W 62–61	4–0	Madison Square Garden; New York, New York
Nov 23, 2001*		vs. No. 18 Syracuse; Preseason NIT	L 67–74	4–1	Madison Square Garden; New York, New York
Nov 27, 2001*	No. 25	Minnesota	W 85–79	5–1	Lawrence Joel Coliseum; Winston-Salem, North Carolina
Dec 4, 2001*	No. 23	at No. 4 Kansas	L 76–83	5–2	Allen Fieldhouse (16,300); Lawrence, Kansas
Dec 7, 2001*	No. 23	South Carolina State	W 115–75	6–2	Lawrence Joel Coliseum; Winston-Salem, North Carolina
Dec 16, 2001	No. 19	Florida State	W 93–72	7–2 (1–0)	Lawrence Joel Coliseum; Winston-Salem, North Carolina
Dec 19, 2001*	No. 20	Saint Francis (PA)	W 89–60	8–2	Lawrence Joel Coliseum; Winston-Salem, North Carolina
Dec 22, 2001*	No. 20	at St. John's	L 60–72	8–3	Madison Square Garden; New York, New York
Dec 29, 2001*	No. 25	No. 19 Marquette	W 64–59	9–3	Lawrence Joel Coliseum; Winston-Salem, North Carolina
Jan 2, 2002*	No. 23	Richmond	W 67–52	10–3	Lawrence Joel Coliseum; Winston-Salem, North Carolina
Jan 5, 2002	No. 23	at North Carolina	W 84–62	11–3 (2–0)	Dean Smith Center; Chapel Hill, North Carolina
Jan 7, 2002*	No. 19	at Navy	W 87–65	12–3	Alumni Hall; Annapolis, Maryland
Jan 12, 2002	No. 19	Clemson	W 96–55	13–3 (3–0)	Lawrence Joel Coliseum; Winston-Salem, North Carolina
Jan 15, 2002	No. 14	at No. 10 Virginia	L 74–86	13–4 (3–1)	University Hall; Charlottesville, Virginia
Jan 19, 2002	No. 14	at No. 1 Duke	L 80–103	13–5 (3–2)	Cameron Indoor Stadium; Durham, North Carolina
Jan 23, 2002	No. 21	No. 3 Maryland	L 63–85	13–6 (3–3)	Lawrence Joel Coliseum; Winston-Salem, North Carolina
Jan 26, 2002	No. 21	Georgia Tech	W 87–74	14–6 (4–3)	Lawrence Joel Coliseum; Winston-Salem, North Carolina
Jan 30, 2002	No. 24	at NC State	W 82–81	15–6 (5–3)	RBC Center; Raleigh, North Carolina
Feb 2, 2002	No. 24	at Florida State	W 89–80	16–6 (6–3)	Donald L. Tucker Center; Tallahassee, Florida
Feb 6, 2002	No. 19	North Carolina	W 90–66	17–6 (7–3)	Lawrence Joel Coliseum; Winston-Salem, North Carolina
Feb 9, 2002*	No. 19	No. 6 Cincinnati	L 94–103	17–7	Lawrence Joel Coliseum; Winston-Salem, North Carolina
Feb 13, 2002	No. 19	at Clemson	L 115–118 ^{2OT}	17–8 (7–4)	Littlejohn Coliseum; Clemson, South Carolina
Feb 17, 2002	No. 19	No. 15 Virginia	W 92–70	18–8 (8–4)	Lawrence Joel Coliseum; Winston-Salem, North Carolina
Feb 21, 2002	No. 21	No. 3 Duke	L 61–90	18–9 (8–5)	Lawrence Joel Coliseum; Winston-Salem, North Carolina
Feb 24, 2002	No. 21	at No. 2 Maryland	L 89–90	18–10 (8–6)	Cole Fieldhouse; College Park, Maryland
Feb 27, 2002	No. 24	at Georgia Tech	L 77–90	18–11 (8–7)	Alexander Memorial Coliseum; Atlanta, Georgia
Mar 2, 2002	No. 24	NC State	W 83–71	19–11 (9–7)	Lawrence Joel Coliseum; Winston-Salem, North Carolina
ACC Tournament
Mar 8, 2002*		vs. Georgia Tech; Quarterfinals	W 92–83	20–11	Charlotte Coliseum; Charlotte, North Carolina
Mar 9, 2002*		vs. No. 3 Duke; Semifinals	L 64–79	20–12	Charlotte Coliseum; Charlotte, North Carolina
NCAA Tournament
Mar 14, 2002*	(7 MW)	vs. (10 MW) Pepperdine; First Round	W 83–74	21–12	ARCO Arena; Sacramento, California
Mar 16, 2002*	(7 MW)	vs. (2 MW) No. 11 Oregon; Second Round	L 87–92	21–13	ARCO Arena; Sacramento, California
*Non-conference game. ^{#}Rankings from AP Poll. (#) Tournament seedings in parentheses. MW=Midwest. All times are in Eastern Standard Time.
