= 2001–02 Duke Blue Devils men's basketball team =

American college basketball season

2001–02 Duke Blue Devils men's basketball

ACC tournament champions Maui Invitational champions

NCAA tournament, Sweet Sixteen
- Conference: Atlantic Coast Conference

Ranking
- Coaches: No. 5
- AP: No. 1
- Record: 31–4 (13–3 ACC)
- Head coach: Mike Krzyzewski (22nd season)
- Assistant coaches: Johnny Dawkins; Chris Collins
- Home arena: Cameron Indoor Stadium

2001–02 ACC men's basketball standings
	Conf.				Overall
Team	W		L	PCT	W		L	PCT
No. 4 Maryland	15	–	1	.938	32	–	4	.889
No. 1 Duke†	13	–	3	.813	31	–	4	.886
Wake Forest	9	–	7	.563	21	–	13	.618
NC State	9	–	7	.563	23	–	11	.676
Virginia	7	–	9	.438	17	–	12	.586
Georgia Tech	7	–	9	.438	15	–	16	.484
North Carolina	4	–	12	.250	8	–	20	.286
Florida State	4	–	12	.250	12	–	17	.414
Clemson	4	–	12	.250	13	–	17	.433
† 2002 ACC tournament winner Rankings from AP Poll

The 2001–02 Duke Blue Devils men's basketball team represented Duke University. The head coach was Mike Krzyzewski. The team played its home games in the Cameron Indoor Stadium in Durham, North Carolina, and was a member of the Atlantic Coast Conference. Duke failed to repeat and win their third title in ten years.

== Player stats ==
Player	Games	Minutes	Field goals	Three pointers	Free throws	Rebounds	Blocks	Steals	Points
Carlos Boozer	35	993	230	0	178	303	21	31	638
Mike Dunleavy	35	1133	218	88	81	251	26	80	605
Jay Williams	35	1175	249	108	140	124	3	76	746

== Schedule and results ==
Date time, TV	Rank^{#}	Opponent^{#}	Result	Record	Site city, state
Regular season
November 19, 2001*	No. 1	vs. Seton Hall; Maui Invitational	W 80–79	1–0	Lahaina Civic Center; Lahaina, Hawaii
November 20, 2001*	No. 1	vs. South Carolina; Maui Invitational	W 81–56	2–0	Lahaina Civic Center; Lahaina, Hawaii
November 21, 2001*	No. 1	vs. Ball State; Maui Invitational	W 83–71	3–0	Lahaina Civic Center; Lahaina, Hawaii
November 25, 2001*	No. 1	Portland	W 104–62	4–0	Cameron Indoor Stadium; Durham, North Carolina
November 27, 2001*	No. 1	vs. No. 7 Iowa; ACC–Big Ten Challenge	W 80–62	5–0	United Center; Chicago, Illinois
December 2, 2001	No. 1	Clemson	W 96–80	6–0 (1–0)	Cameron Indoor Stadium; Durham, North Carolina
December 5, 2001*	No. 1	Temple	W 82–57	7–0	Cameron Indoor Stadium; Durham, North Carolina
December 8, 2001*	No. 1	at Michigan; Rivalry	W 104–83	8–0	Crisler Arena; Ann Arbor, Michigan
December 16, 2001*	No. 1	North Carolina A&T	W 93–51	9–0	Cameron Indoor Stadium; Durham, North Carolina
December 18, 2001*	No. 1	vs. No. 7 Kentucky	W 95-92 ^{OT}	10–0	IZOD Center; East Rutherford, New Jersey
December 29, 2001*	No. 1	San Diego State	W 92–79	11–0	Cameron Indoor Stadium; Durham, North Carolina
January 2, 2002*	No. 1	vs. Davidson	W 106–71	12–0	Bojangles' Coliseum; Charlotte, North Carolina
January 6, 2002	No. 1	at Florida State	L 76–77	12–1 (1–1)	Donald L. Tucker Civic Center; Tallahassee, Florida
January 8, 2002	No. 2	Georgia Tech	W 104–79	13–1 (2–1)	Cameron Indoor Stadium; Durham, North Carolina
January 13, 2002	No. 2	at NC State	W 76–57	14–1 (3–1)	RBC Center; Raleigh, North Carolina
January 17, 2002	No. 1	No. 3 Maryland; Rivalry	W 99–78	15–1 (4–1)	Cameron Indoor Stadium; Durham, North Carolina
January 19, 2002	No. 1	No. 14 Wake Forest	W 103–80	16–1 (5–1)	Cameron Indoor Stadium; Durham, North Carolina
January 24, 2002*	No. 1	at Boston College	W 88–78	17–1	Conte Forum; Chestnut Hill, Massachusetts
January 27, 2002	No. 1	No. 7 Virginia	W 94–81	18–1 (6–1)	Cameron Indoor Stadium; Durham, North Carolina
January 31, 2002	No. 1	at North Carolina; Rivalry	W 87–58	19–1 (7–1)	Dean Smith Center; Chapel Hill, North Carolina
February 2, 2002	No. 1	at Clemson	W 98–88	20–1 (8–1)	Littlejohn Coliseum; Clemson, South Carolina
February 7, 2002	No. 1	Florida State	W 80–49	21–1 (9–1)	Cameron Indoor Stadium; Durham, North Carolina
February 9, 2002	No. 1	at Georgia Tech	W 95–63	22–1 (10–1)	Alexander Memorial Coliseum; Atlanta, Georgia
February 14, 2002	No. 1	No. 24 NC State	W 108–71	23–1 (11–1)	Cameron Indoor Stadium; Durham, North Carolina
February 17, 2002	No. 1	at No. 3 Maryland; Rivalry	L 73–87	23–2 (11–2)	Cole Field House; College Park, Maryland
February 21, 2002	No. 3	at No. 20 Wake Forest	W 90–61	24–2 (12–2)	LJVM Coliseum; Winston-Salem, North Carolina
February 24, 2002*	No. 3	St. John's	W 97–55	25–2	Cameron Indoor Stadium; Durham, North Carolina
February 28, 2002	No. 3	at Virginia	L 84–87	25–3 (12–3)	University Hall; Charlottesville, Virginia
March 3, 2002	No. 3	North Carolina; Rivalry	W 93–68	26–3 (13–3)	Cameron Indoor Stadium; Durham, North Carolina
ACC tournament
March 8, 2002	(2) No. 3	vs. (7) North Carolina; Quarterfinals	W 60–48	27–3	Greensboro Coliseum; Greensboro, North Carolina
March 9, 2002	(2) No. 3	vs. (3) Wake Forest; Semifinals	W 79–64	28–3	Greensboro Coliseum; Greensboro, North Carolina
March 10, 2002	(2) No. 3	vs. (4) NC State; Championship	W 91–61	29–3	Greensboro Coliseum; Greensboro, North Carolina
NCAA tournament
March 14, 2002*	(1 S) No. 1	vs. (16 S) Winthrop; First Round	W 84–37	30–3	BI-LO Center; Greenville, South Carolina
March 16, 2002*	(1 S) No. 1	vs. (8 S) Notre Dame; Second Round	W 84–77	31–3	BI-LO Center; Greenville, South Carolina
March 21, 2002*	(1 S) No. 1	vs. (5 S) No. 23 Indiana; Sweet Sixteen	L 73–74	31–4	Rupp Arena; Lexington, Kentucky
*Non-conference game. ^{#}Rankings from AP Poll. (#) Tournament seedings in parentheses.

== Awards and honors ==
- Duke Blue Devils became the first team to be seeded #1 in the NCAA tournament for five straight seasons.
- The team finished the regular season ranked #1 in the AP Poll for the fourth straight year.
- Jason Williams was a National Player of the Year winner for the second straight year, but oddly enough didn't win ACC Player of the Year in either 2000–01 or 2001–02. Shane Battier and Joseph Forte shared the award in '01 and Maryland's Juan Dixon won it in '02.

== Team players drafted into the NBA ==
Round	Pick	Player	NBA club
1	2	Jay Williams	Chicago Bulls
1	3	Mike Dunleavy Jr.	Golden State Warriors
2	34	Carlos Boozer	Cleveland Cavaliers
