= Ray Lopes =

American basketball coach (born 1962)

Personal information
- Born: December 8, 1962 (age 63) New Haven, Connecticut, U.S.

Career information
- High school: Moreau Catholic (Hayward, California)
- College: West Valley CC (1983–1985); College of Idaho (1985–1987)
- Coaching career: 1987–2014

Career history

Coaching
- 1987–1988: West Valley CC (assistant)
- 1988–1989: Weber State (assistant)
- 1989–1993: UC Santa Barbara (assistant)
- 1993–1994: Washington State (assistant)
- 1994–2002: Oklahoma (assistant)
- 2002–2005: Fresno State
- 2006–2008: Idaho Stampede (associate HC)
- 2008–2009: Idaho (assistant)
- 2009–2012: Idaho (associate HC)
- 2012–2014: Washington State (assistant)

Career highlights
- As coach: WAC regular season (2003); WAC Coach of the Year (2003)

Career coaching record
- NCAA: 50–37 (.575)

Raymond Lopes (born December 8, 1962) is an American basketball coach who was most recently an assistant coach at Washington State University. He was the head men's basketball coach at Fresno State from 2002 to 2005, before resigning due to his involvement in the recruiting violations the program committed during his time there.

== Coaching career ==
Lopes began his coaching career at West Valley Community College as an assistant coach, later going on to coach at Weber State, UC Santa Barbara, Washington State, and Oklahoma.

=== Fresno State ===
Lopes was named the head coach at Fresno State on April 3, 2002, replacing Jerry Tarkanian. In his first season at the helm, he led the Bulldogs to their first outright regular season conference title since 1965 en route to earning conference Coach of the Year honors.

Lopes resigned from Fresno State after the 2004–05 season after it was revealed that he had violated the telephone contact recruiting rule, something that he had also done while as an assistant at Oklahoma. He received a three-year show-cause penalty as a punishment, beginning from his departure from Fresno State.

=== Post–Fresno State ===
Lopes spent one season as a scout with the San Antonio Spurs before joining the Idaho Stampede of the NBA D-League as the associate head coach. He was also an assistant coach at Idaho before returning for another stint at Washington State as an assistant.

== Head coaching record ==
Record table
| Season | Team | Overall | Conference | Standing | Postseason |
|---|---|---|---|---|---|
Fresno State (Western Athletic Conference) (2002–2005)
| 2002–03 | Fresno State | 20–8 (Note: Fresno State was not eligible for the NCAA tournament as they were under probation for academic violations and as a result, was not eligible for the WAC tournament.) | 13–5 | 1st | |
| 2003–04 | Fresno State | 14–15 | 10–8 | 6th | |
| 2004–05 | Fresno State | 16–14 | 9–9 | T–4th | |
| Fresno State: | | 50–37 (.575) | 32–22 (.593) | | |
| Total: | | 50–37 (.575) | | | |
National champion Postseason invitational champion Conference regular season champion Conference regular season and conference tournament champion Division regular season champion Division regular season and conference tournament champion Conference tournament champion
