= 2002 ACC men's basketball tournament =

- 2002 ACC Tournament logo
- Classification: Division I
- Season: 2001–02
- Teams: 9
- Site: Charlotte Coliseum; Charlotte, North Carolina
- Champions: Duke (13th title)
- Winning coach: Mike Krzyzewski (7th title)
- MVP: Carlos Boozer (Duke)

The 2002 Atlantic Coast Conference men's basketball tournament took place from March 7 to 10 in Charlotte, North Carolina, at the second Charlotte Coliseum. Duke won the tournament for the fourth year in a row, defeating NC State in the championship game. Duke's Carlos Boozer won the tournament's most valuable player award.

The University of Maryland finished in first place during the regular season but lost to NC State in the semifinal round. Maryland went on to win the NCAA Championship for the first time.

Duke defeated all three of their in-state rivals on their way to the tournament championship, beating North Carolina in the quarterfinal round, Wake Forest in the semifinal, and NC State in the championship game.

The 2002 tournament was the last one held at Charlotte Coliseum. Shortly after the ACC Tournament, the NBA Hornets moved to New Orleans. The NBA subsequently awarded Charlotte an expansion team, who requested a new arena be constructed in central Charlotte. The Coliseum therefore closed in 2005 and was imploded in 2007. Future ACC Tournaments in Charlotte have been played at the considerably smaller Spectrum Center.

2001–02 ACC men's basketball standings
	Conf.				Overall
Team	W		L	PCT	W		L	PCT
No. 4 Maryland	15	–	1	.938	32	–	4	.889
No. 1 Duke†	13	–	3	.813	31	–	4	.886
Wake Forest	9	–	7	.563	21	–	13	.618
NC State	9	–	7	.563	23	–	11	.676
Virginia	7	–	9	.438	17	–	12	.586
Georgia Tech	7	–	9	.438	15	–	16	.484
North Carolina	4	–	12	.250	8	–	20	.286
Florida State	4	–	12	.250	12	–	17	.414
Clemson	4	–	12	.250	13	–	17	.433
† 2002 ACC tournament winner Rankings from AP Poll

== Bracket ==
First round March 7, 2002
8	Florida State	91
9	Clemson	84

Quarterfinals; March 8, 2002
1	#2 Maryland	85
8	Florida State	59
4	NC State	92
5	Virginia	72
2	#3 Duke	60
7	North Carolina	48
3	Wake Forest	92
6	Georgia Tech	83

Semifinals; March 9, 2002
1	#2 Maryland	82
4	NC State	86
2	#3 Duke	79
3	Wake Forest	64

Championship Game; March 10, 2002
4	NC State	61
2	#3 Duke	91

AP Rankings at time of tournament
