= 2001–02 Maryland Terrapins men's basketball team =

American college basketball season

2001–02 Maryland Terrapins men's basketball
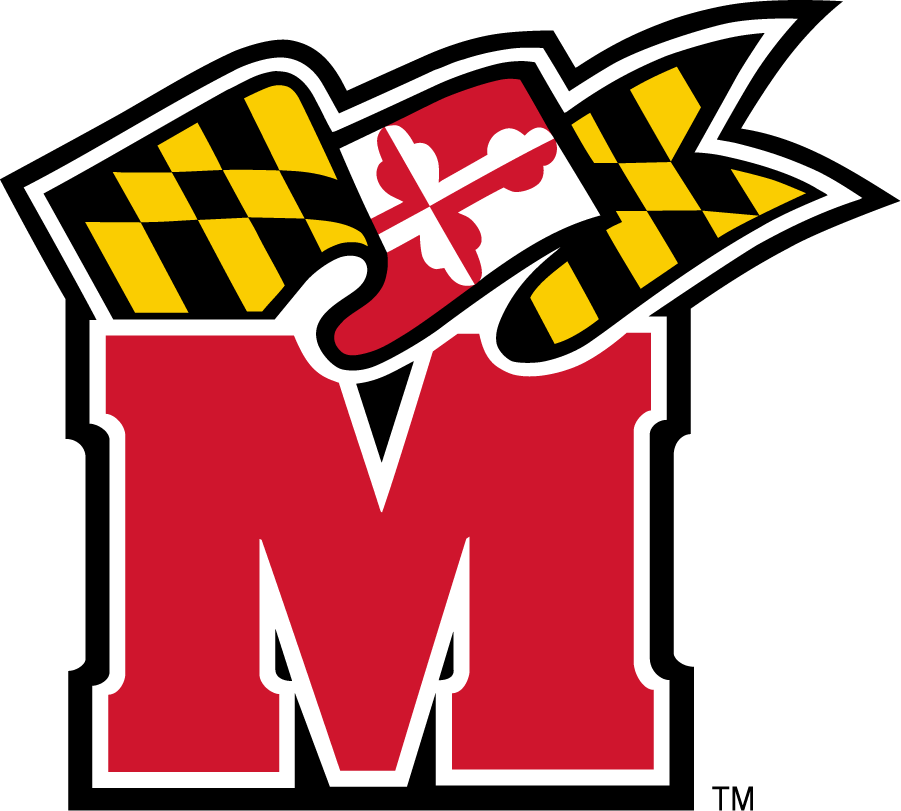

NCAA tournament National Champions ACC regular season champions BB&T Classic champions

National Championship Game, W 64–52 vs. Indiana
- Conference: Atlantic Coast Conference

Ranking
- Coaches: No. 1
- AP: No. 4
- Record: 32–4 (15–1 ACC)
- Head coach: Gary Williams (13th season)
- Assistant coaches: Jimmy Patsos; Dave Dickerson; Matt Kovarik; Troy Wainwright
- Home arena: Cole Field House

2001–02 ACC men's basketball standings
	Conf.				Overall
Team	W		L	PCT	W		L	PCT
No. 4 Maryland	15	–	1	.938	32	–	4	.889
No. 1 Duke†	13	–	3	.813	31	–	4	.886
Wake Forest	9	–	7	.563	21	–	13	.618
NC State	9	–	7	.563	23	–	11	.676
Virginia	7	–	9	.438	17	–	12	.586
Georgia Tech	7	–	9	.438	15	–	16	.484
North Carolina	4	–	12	.250	8	–	20	.286
Florida State	4	–	12	.250	12	–	17	.414
Clemson	4	–	12	.250	13	–	17	.433
† 2002 ACC tournament winner Rankings from AP Poll

The 2001–02 Maryland Terrapins men's basketball team represented the University of Maryland in the 2001–2002 college basketball season as a member of the Atlantic Coast Conference (ACC). The team was led by head coach Gary Williams and played their home games at Cole Field House. The Terrapins were champions of the 2002 NCAA Division I men's basketball tournament, earning the first national championship in school history.

== Preseason ==
=== Accolades ===
Team
ESPN/USA Today Coaches' poll ranked preseason #2

== Roster ==
2001–02 Maryland Terrapins men's basketball team
Players
Coaches

Pos.	#	Name	Height	Weight	Year	Hometown
G/F	1	Byron Mouton	6 ft 6 in (1.98 m)	215 lb (98 kg)	Sr	Rayne, Louisiana
G	3	Juan Dixon	6 ft 3 in (1.91 m)	164 lb (74 kg)	Sr	Baltimore, Maryland
G	4	Earl Badu	6 ft 0 in (1.83 m)	160 lb (73 kg)	Sr	Baltimore, Maryland
G	5	Calvin McCall	6 ft 3 in (1.91 m)	200 lb (91 kg)	Sr	Orlando, Florida
G	10	Andre Collins	5 ft 9 in (1.75 m)	180 lb (82 kg)	Fr	Crisfield, Maryland
G	12	Drew Nicholas	6 ft 3 in (1.91 m)	160 lb (73 kg)	Jr	Hempstead, New York
F	21	Mike Grinnon	6 ft 6 in (1.98 m)	225 lb (102 kg)	Fr	Huntington, New York
G	25	Steve Blake	6 ft 3 in (1.91 m)	172 lb (78 kg)	Jr	Miami Lakes, Florida
F/C	33	Ryan Randle	6 ft 9 in (2.06 m)	255 lb (116 kg)	Jr	Duncanville, Texas
F/C	35	Lonny Baxter	6 ft 7 in (2.01 m)	260 lb (118 kg)	Sr	Silver Spring, Maryland
F	45	Tahj Holden	6 ft 10 in (2.08 m)	247 lb (112 kg)	Jr	Red Bank, New Jersey
F/C	54	Chris Wilcox	6 ft 10 in (2.08 m)	210 lb (95 kg)	So	Whiteville, North Carolina

Head coach

- Gary Williams (Maryland)

Assistant coach(es)

- Dave Dickerson (Maryland)
- Jimmy Patsos (Catholic)
- Matt Kovarik (Maryland)
- Troy Wainwright (Maryland)

Legend

- (C) Team captain
- (S) Suspended
- (I) Ineligible
- (W) Walk-on
- Injured
- Current redshirt

Roster

=== Depth chart ===
Pos.	Starting 5	Bench 1	Bench 2
C	Lonny Baxter	Ryan Randle
PF	Chris Wilcox	Tahj Holden
SF	Byron Mouton	Calvin McCall	Mike Grinnon
SG	Juan Dixon	Drew Nicholas
PG	Steve Blake	Andre Collins	Earl Badu

== Season recap ==
=== Accolades ===
Lonny Baxter

- Wooden Award All-American Team
- NCAA West Regional Most Outstanding Player
- Second Team All-ACC

Juan Dixon

- AP First Team All-American
- USBWA First Team All-American
- Wooden Award All-American Team
- Chip Hilton Player of the Year Award
- Senior CLASS Award
- ACC Player of the Year
- First Team All-ACC

Gary Williams

- ACC Coach of the Year
- Eastern College Coach of the Year

== Schedule ==
Date time, TV	Rank^{#}	Opponent^{#}	Result	Record	High points	High rebounds	High assists	Site (attendance) city, state
Exhibition
November 2*; 8:00 p.m.		EA Sports All-Stars	W 98–80	–	22 – Baxter	10 – Baxter	9 – Blake	Cole Field House (10,612); College Park, Maryland
November 13*; 8:00 p.m.		Nike Elite	W 99–67	–	22 – Baxter	7 – Baxter	10 – Blake	Cole Field House (10,000); College Park, Maryland
Regular Season
November 8*	No. 2	vs. Arizona; Coaches vs. Cancer IKON Classic	L 67–71	0–1	21 – Dixon	10 – Blake	5 – Dixon	Madison Square Garden (12,615); New York City
November 9*	No. 2	vs. No. 16 Temple; Coaches vs. Cancer IKON Classic	W 82–74	1–1	25 – Dixon	9 – Wilcox	6 – Nicholas	Madison Square Garden; New York
November 17*; 1:00 p.m.	No. 2	American	W 83–53	2–1	25 – Baxter	10 – Mouton	9 – Blake	Cole Field House (13,485); College Park, Maryland
November 24*; 1:00 pm	No. 6	Delaware State	W 77–53	3–1	18 – Baxter	12 – Baxter	5 – Blake	Cole Field House (13,146); College Park, Maryland
November 27*; 7:00 p.m.	No. 5	No. 2 Illinois; ACC–Big Ten Challenge	W 76–63	4–1	25 – Dixon	6 – Holden, Wilcox	9 – Blake	Cole Field House (14,500); College Park, Maryland
December 2*; 1:00 p.m.	No. 5	vs. Princeton; BB&T Classic	W 61–53	5–1	18 – Baxter	12 – Baxter	8 – Blake	MCI Center; Washington, D.C.
December 3*; 8:00 p.m.	No. 5	vs. Connecticut; BB&T Classic	W 77–65	6–1	24 – Baxter	10 – Baxter	9 – Blake	MCI Center (14,813); Washington, D.C.
December 9*; 6:30 p.m.	No. 3	Detroit	W 79–54	7–1	17 – Baxter	7 – Baxter	8 – Blake	Cole Field House (14,327); College Park, Maryland
December 11*; 8:00 p.m.	No. 3	Monmouth	W 91–55	8–1	18 – Dixon	9 – Baxter	7 – Blake	Cole Field House (13,336); College Park, Maryland
December 21*; 9:00 p.m.	No. 2	at No. 22 Oklahoma	L 56–72	8–2	15 – Wilcox	10 – Baxter	6 – Blake	Lloyd Noble Center (12,715); Norman, Oklahoma
December 27*; 7:30 p.m.	No. 8	William & Mary	W 103–75	9–2	19 – Dixon, Mouton	10 – Baxter	9 – Blake, Dixon	Cole Field House (14,500); College Park, Maryland
December 30	No. 8	at NC State	W 72–65	10–2 (1–0)	–	–	–	Raleigh Entertainment & Sports Arena; Raleigh, North Carolina
January 3*; 8:00 p.m.	No. 8	Norfolk State	W 92–69	11–2	17 – Dixon	8 – Randle	9 – Blake	Cole Field House (13,201); College Park, Maryland
January 9; 7:30 p.m.	No. 4	North Carolina	W 112–79	12–2 (2–0)	29 – Dixon	9 – Blake	14 – Blake	Cole Field House (14,500); College Park, Maryland
January 13; 2:05 p.m.	No. 4	at Georgia Tech	W 92–87	13–2 (3–0)	26 – Dixon	10 – Dixon	5 – Blake	Alexander Memorial Coliseum (6,332); Atlanta
January 17; 9:05 p.m.	No. 3	at No. 1 Duke	L 78–99	13–3 (3–1)	24 – Baxter	8 – Baxter	8 – Blake	Cameron Indoor Stadium (9,314); Durham, North Carolina
January 20; 6:30 p.m.	No. 3	Clemson	W 99–90	14–3 (4–1)	23 – Dixon	14 – Wilcox	13 – Blake	Cole Field House (14,500); College Park, Maryland
January 23; 7:35 p.m.	No. 3	at No. 21 Wake Forest	W 85–63	15–3 (5–1)	19 – Blake, Dixon	5 – Wilcox	4 – Mouton	Lawrence Joel Veterans Memorial Coliseum (13,886); Winston-Salem, North Carolina
January 26; 4:00 p.m.	No. 3	Florida State	W 84–63	16–3 (6–1)	25 – Dixon	11 – Dixon	9 – Blake	Cole Field House (14,500); College Park, Maryland
January 31; 7:00 p.m.	No. 3	at No. 8 Virginia	W 91–87	17–3 (7–1)	21 – Mouton	10 – Baxter	4 – Blake, Dixon	University Hall (8,392); Charlottesville, Virginia
February 3; 4:00 p.m.	No. 3	NC State	W 89–73	18–3 (8–1)	27 – Dixon	6 – Mouton	6 – Blake	Cole Field House (14,500); College Park, Maryland
February 10; 6:30 p.m.	No. 3	at North Carolina	W 92–77	19–3 (9–1)	18 – Dixon	10 – Baxter	9 – Blake	Dean Smith Center (18,751); Chapel Hill, North Carolina
February 13; 7:30 p.m.	No. 3	Georgia Tech	W 85–65	20–3 (10–1)	22 – Baxter	12 – Wilcox	8 – Blake	Cole Field House (14,500); College Park, Maryland
February 17; 1:00 p.m., CBS	No. 3	No. 1 Duke	W 87–73	21–3 (11–1)	23 – Wilcox	11 – Wilcox	13 – Blake	Cole Field House (14,500); College Park, Maryland
February 20	No. 2	at Clemson	W 84–68	22–3 (12–1)	21 – Dixon	12 – Baxter	9 – Blake	Littlejohn Coliseum (8,500); Clemson, South Carolina
February 24; 2:00 p.m.	No. 2	No. 20 Wake Forest	W 90–89	23–3 (13–1)	25 – Baxter	9 – Wilcox	13 – Blake	Cole Field House (14,500); College Park, Maryland
February 27	No. 2	at Florida State	W 96–63	24–3 (14–1)	25 – Dixon	6 – Blake, Baxter	12 – Blake	Donald L. Tucker Center (6,461); Tallahassee, Florida
March 3; 8:00 p.m., Fox Sports Net	No. 2	Virginia	W 111–92	25–3 (15–1)	23 – Dixon	11 – Wilcox	10 – Blake	Cole Field House (14,500); College Park, Maryland
ACC Tournament
March 8; 12:00 p.m.	(1) No. 2	vs. (8) Florida State; Quarterfinals	W 85–59	26–3	20 – Dixon	8 – Wilcox	7 – Blake	Charlotte Coliseum (23,895); Charlotte, North Carolina
March 9; 1:30 p.m.	(1) No. 2	vs. (4) NC State; Semifinals	L 82–86	26–4	21 – Blake	7 – Baxter, Mouton	11 – Blake	Charlotte Coliseum (23,895); Charlotte, North Carolina
NCAA tournament
March 15*; 10:20 p.m., CBS	(E1) No. 4	vs. (E16) Siena; First Round	W 85–70	27–4	29 – Dixon	9 – Baxter	11 – Blake	MCI Center (18,770); Washington, D.C.
March 17*; 4:56 p.m., CBS	(E1) No. 4	vs. (E8) Wisconsin; Second Round	W 87–57	28–4	29 – Dixon	7 – Baxter, Mouton, Wilcox	4 – Blake	MCI Center (18,789); Washington, D.C.
March 22*; 10:08 p.m.	(E1) No. 4	vs. (E4) No. 16 Kentucky; Sweet Sixteen	W 78–68	29–4	19 – Dixon	7 – Dixon	5 – Blake, Nicholas	Carrier Dome (29,633); Syracuse, New York
March 24*; 5:00 p.m.	(E1) No. 4	vs. (E2) No. 10 Connecticut; Elite Eight	W 90–82	30–4	29 – Baxter	9 – Baxter	6 – Blake	Carrier Dome (29,252); Syracuse, New York
March 30*; 8:51 p.m., CBS	(E1) No. 4	vs. (M1) No. 2 Kansas; Final Four	W 97–88	31–4	33 – Dixon	9 – Wilcox	11 – Blake	Georgia Dome (53,378); Atlanta
April 1*; 9:18 p.m.	(E1) No. 4	vs. (S5) Indiana; National Championship	W 64–52	32–4	18 – Dixon	14 – Baxter	4 – Holden	Georgia Dome (53,406); Atlanta
*Non-conference game. ^{#}Rankings from AP Poll. (#) Tournament seedings in parentheses. Men's Basketball - 2001-02 Schedule

== Statistics ==
Player	GP	GS	MPG	FG%	3FG%	FT%	RPG	APG	SPG	BPG	PPG
Juan Dixon	36	36	33.6	.469	.397	.898	4.6	2.9	2.6	0.2	20.4
Lonny Baxter	35	35	28.7	.545	.000	.623	8.2	0.8	0.9	2.0	15.2
Chris Wilcox	36	26	24.1	.504	.000	.585	7.1	1.5	0.8	1.5	12.0
Byron Mouton	36	35	28.3	.469	.255	.767	5.0	2.1	0.9	0.2	11.1
Steve Blake	36	36	32.0	.382	.344	.824	3.8	7.9	1.6	0.4	8.0
Drew Nicholas	36	1	20.5	.477	.396	.803	2.3	2.4	0.3	0.4	7.1
Tahj Holden	36	11	18.5	.453	.425	.836	2.7	1.2	0.6	0.9	5.6
