= Byron Mouton =

American basketball player

Personal information
- Born: April 29, 1978 (age 48) Rayne, Louisiana, U.S.
- Listed height: 6 ft 6 in (1.98 m)
- Listed weight: 225 lb (102 kg)

Career information
- High school: Rayne (Rayne, Louisiana)
- College: Tulane (1997–1999); Maryland (2000–2002)
- NBA draft: 2002: undrafted
- Position: Small forward / shooting guard

Career history
- 2002–2003: Idaho Stampede
- 2004–2005: Florida Flame

Career highlights
- CBA All-Rookie Team (2003); NCAA champion (2002)

Byron King Mouton (born April 29, 1978) is an American retired basketball player. He was a starter on the University of Maryland's 2002 national championship team and played professionally in several countries.

== College career ==
Mouton, a 6'6" swingman from Rayne, Louisiana, originally committed to play basketball at the University of Kentucky, but opted out of his commitment after Wildcats coach Rick Pitino left to coach the Boston Celtics in 1997. Instead, he opted for Tulane. After two seasons at Tulane, Mouton transferred to Maryland to play for coach Gary Williams. In his junior year of 2000–01, Mouton started and averaged 9.6 points and 4.0 rebounds per game as the Terrapins advanced to the Final Four of the 2001 NCAA tournament. As a senior in 2001–02, Mouton upped his averages to 11.1 points and 5.0 rebounds per game as Maryland won the 2002 NCAA championship.

== Professional career ==
At the end of his college career, Mouton was invited to the Boston Celtics' training camp, but did not make the team. He played for the Idaho Stampede of the Continental Basketball Association (CBA) during the 2002–03 season and was named to the CBA All-Rookie Team.

He played professionally in Germany, France, China and the Dominican Republic. In the United States, Mouton played in the Continental Basketball Association for the Idaho Stampede, in the NBA Development League for the Florida Flame and in the American Basketball Association for the Wilmington Sea Dawgs and the Maryland GreenHawks. He founded and still runs a youth basketball program in Maryland called 6th Man Sports. Byron is currently the head basketball coach for Lanham Christian School in Lanham, Maryland. In 2019 Byron led Lanham Christian to victory in the Maryland Christian Schools Tournament Division 1 championship. https://www.somdnews.com/independent/sports/scoreboard/southern-maryland-winter-sports-scoreboard/article_898caeae-623f-580d-b6c1-1775f13f8278.html
