= Melvin Scott =

American basketball player (born 1982)

Personal information
- Born: February 3, 1982 (age 44) Baltimore, Maryland, U.S.
- Listed height: 6 ft 2 in (1.88 m)
- Listed weight: 190 lb (86 kg)

Career information
- High school: Southern (Baltimore, Maryland)
- College: North Carolina (2001–2005)
- NBA draft: 2005: undrafted
- Playing career: 2005–2011
- Position: Shooting guard

Career history
- 2005: BS Energy Braunschweig
- 2006: KR-B
- 2006: KR
- 2006: Austin Toros
- 2007: Minot SkyRockets

Career highlights
- NCAA champion (2005)

Melvin Scott (born February 3, 1982) is a former North Carolina Tar Heels men's basketball guard. He played on the 2004-2005 National Championship Team. He played all four eligible years and was not drafted by the NBA. He played high school basketball at Southern High in Baltimore. He played with KR Basket in Iceland's Úrvalsdeild.

== Career ==
Scott was signed by KR-b, KR reserve team, in January 2006 ahead of its upcoming game against Grindavík in the Icelandic Cup. In the game, he scored 42 points in KR-B's 69–92 loss. Three weeks later, Scott was signed by KR's main team for the rest of the Úrvalsdeild karla season in place of Omari Westley, who was released after he was suspended for four games by the league. He helped KR to the semi-finals of the Úrvalsdeild playoffs where they bowed out to Njarðvík in four games, 3–1.

In 2017, Scott was hired as the Director of Basketball Operations at Tennessee Tech.
