= Carlos Boozer =

American basketball player (born 1981)

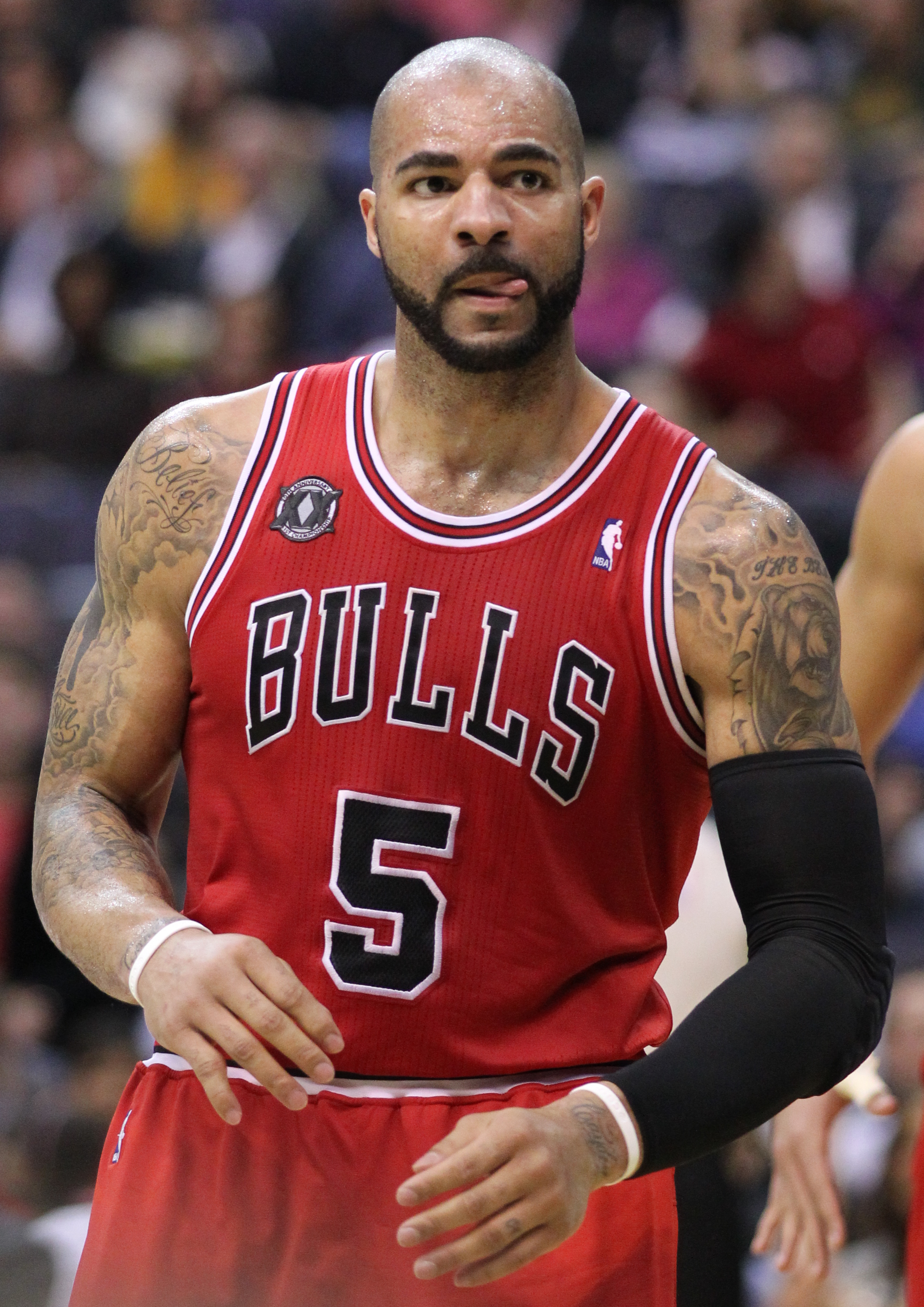
- Boozer with the Chicago Bulls in 2011

Personal information
- Born: November 20, 1981 (age 44) Aschaffenburg, West Germany
- Listed height: 6 ft 9 in (2.06 m)
- Listed weight: 258 lb (117 kg)

Career information
- High school: Juneau-Douglas (Juneau, Alaska)
- College: Duke (1999–2002)
- NBA draft: 2002: 2nd round, 35th overall pick
- Drafted by: Cleveland Cavaliers
- Playing career: 2002–2017
- Position: Power forward
- Number: 1, 5

Career history
- 2002–2004: Cleveland Cavaliers
- 2004–2010: Utah Jazz
- 2010–2014: Chicago Bulls
- 2014–2015: Los Angeles Lakers
- 2016–2017: Guangdong Southern Tigers

Career highlights
- 2× NBA All-Star (2007, 2008); All-NBA Third Team (2008); NBA All-Rookie Second Team (2003); NCAA champion (2001); Third-team All-America – AP, NABC (2002); First-team All-ACC (2002); ACC tournament MVP (2002); ACC All-Freshman team (2000); McDonald's All-American (1999); First-team Parade All-American (1999); Third-team Parade All-American (1998)

Career statistics
- Points: 13,976 (16.2 ppg)
- Rebounds: 8,192 (9.5 rpg)
- Assists: 1,928 (2.2 apg)
- Stats at NBA.com
- Stats at Basketball Reference
Medals
Men's basketball
Representing United States
Summer Olympics
Gold medal – first place	2008 Beijing	Team competition
Bronze medal – third place	2004 Athens	Team competition
FIBA U21 World Championship
Gold medal – first place	2001 Saitama	Team competition

Carlos Austin Boozer Jr. (born November 20, 1981) is an American former professional basketball player. A two-time NBA All-Star, he played for the Cleveland Cavaliers, Utah Jazz, Chicago Bulls, and Los Angeles Lakers, and then spent his last season playing overseas with the Guangdong Southern Tigers. As a member of Team USA, Boozer won an Olympic bronze medal at the 2004 Summer Olympics and an Olympic gold medal at the 2008 Summer Olympics.

== Early life ==
Although born at a military base in Aschaffenburg, West Germany, Boozer grew up in Juneau, Alaska, from 1988 to 1999. His family relocated to Juneau from Washington, D.C., following the fatal shooting of his seven-year-old friend after a neighborhood pickup basketball game. In his memoir, Boozer recounted that his friend died in his arms, an event that prompted his parents to seek a safer, quieter environment for their children. He was one of five children of Carlos and Renee, each of whom worked two jobs as he grew up.

== High school and college career ==
Boozer was a two-time member of the PARADE All-American high school basketball team, leading the Juneau-Douglas Crimson Bears to back-to-back state titles. In 2023, he was inducted into the National High School Hall of Fame.

Boozer was recruited by many top-tier collegiate basketball programs, including St. John's and UCLA, but Boozer elected to play for Duke University, coached by Mike Krzyzewski, and helped the team win the 2001 NCAA championship.

In 2001–02, Boozer, Jason Williams, and Mike Dunleavy Jr. each scored at least 600 points for the season, a feat only matched at Duke by Jon Scheyer, Kyle Singler and Nolan Smith in the 2009–10 season. Boozer won the 2002 ACC Tournament MVP.

In April 2002, Boozer declared for the NBA draft, foregoing his final year of college eligibility. On September 16, 2020, Boozer graduated with a bachelor's degree from the Trinity College of Arts and Sciences at Duke University.

== Professional career ==
=== Cleveland Cavaliers (2002–2004) ===
Boozer was selected with the 35th overall pick in the 2002 NBA draft by the Cleveland Cavaliers. Boozer averaged 10.0 points and 7.5 rebounds per game in his rookie campaign, and followed it up with 15.5 points and 11.4 rebounds per game his second year.

==== Free agency controversy ====
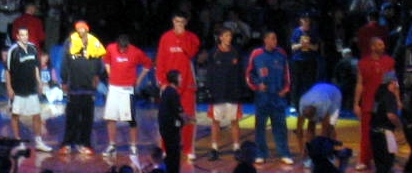
Boozer (first from right) standing with the Sophomores team during the 2004 Rookie Challenge game

After the 2003–04 season, the Cavaliers had the option of allowing him to become a restricted free agent, or keeping him under contract for one more year at a $695,000 salary. The Cavaliers claimed to have reached an understanding with Boozer and his agent on a deal for approximately $39 million over six years, which he would have signed if they let him out of his current deal.

Cleveland then proceeded to release him from his contract making him a restricted free agent. During this period, the Utah Jazz offered Boozer a six-year, $70 million contract that Cleveland chose not to match due to salary cap considerations. On July 30, 2004, Boozer officially signed with the Jazz.

Then Cavaliers owner Gordon Gund said, "In the final analysis, I decided to trust Carlos and show him the respect he asked for. He did not show that trust and respect in return." However, Boozer denied that he made any commitment to the Cavaliers: "There was no commitment. It's unfortunate how the turn of events went through the media", Boozer said shortly after signing the deal with Utah. "I'm not a guy that gives my word and takes it away. I think I've made that clear." Boozer later claimed that he originally intended to re-sign with the Cavaliers, but he and his team subsequently found out that his negotiations with the Cavaliers may lead to a tampering violation investigation from the NBA and severe penalty for the Cavaliers if he signed, causing him to come to the conclusion he had to move on, against his original intentions.

=== Utah Jazz (2004–2010) ===
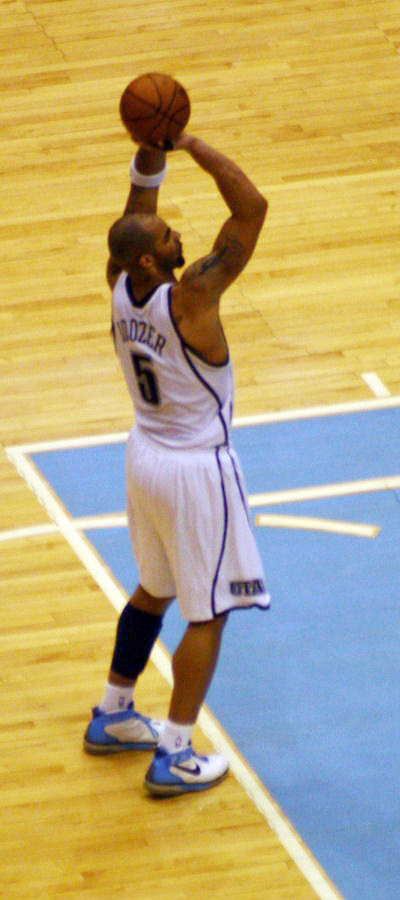
Boozer shooting a free throw while playing with the Utah Jazz in March 2008

In his first season with the Jazz in 2004–05, Boozer averaged 17 points and 9 rebounds per game. However, he suffered an injury, missing the later part of the season, which contributed to the Jazz missing the playoffs for only the second time in 22 years, and he was publicly criticized for a lack of effort by team owner Larry Miller.

As the 2005–06 season began, Boozer was still recovering from injury, and then aggravated a hamstring, causing him to miss the first half of that season as well. He returned to action in late February, easing into action by coming off the bench for the Jazz. In the middle of March, he was placed back into the starting lineup. From that point, he finished the season in impressive fashion, averaging over 20 points and almost 10 rebounds per game and firmly establishing himself as the Jazz's starting power forward once again.

Boozer got off to a strong start in the 2006–07 season, winning the Western Conference Player of the Week Award and helping the Jazz to win eleven of their first twelve games. Boozer was named part of the NBA All-Star roster as a reserve, but could not participate because of a hairline fracture in his left fibula.

In an April 23, 2007 game against the Houston Rockets (game two of the first round of the 2007 playoffs), Boozer scored 41 points, tying the career high he had set a month earlier on March 26 (vs. the Washington Wizards). He also led the Jazz past the Rockets in game 7 of the first round in the NBA Playoffs, scoring 35 points, grabbing 14 rebounds and two clutch free throws to secure the victory in Boozer's first playoff series.

The Jazz would go on to win their second round series against the upstart Golden State Warriors, 4 games to 1, and advance to the Western Conference Finals for the first time since 1998. Even though they lost 4 games to 1 to the more experienced San Antonio Spurs, Boozer proved valuable and durable. He ended the season averaging 20.9 points and 11.7 rebounds per game, and playing in 74 of 82 games. He was even better in the playoffs, increasing his output to 23.5 points and 12.2 rebounds per game, and appearing in all 17 Jazz playoff games.

In November 2007, Boozer was named Western Conference Player of the Month. By mid-December, he was among the league's top five performers in scoring, rebounding and field goal percentage. Although he later slipped in all of these categories, he continued to produce solid numbers. Boozer was again chosen as a backup in the All-Star Game, finishing with 14 points and 10 rebounds in just 19 minutes of play. He registered his first career triple-double against the Seattle SuperSonics on February 13, 2008, with 22 points, 11 rebounds, and 10 assists.

In the 2008 playoffs, the Jazz faced the Houston Rockets in the first round for the second year in a row. Determined to not allow him to beat them, the Rockets geared their defense more to stopping Boozer and his production was somewhat limited (16.0 points and 11.7 rebounds per game), but the Jazz defeated the Rockets, 4–2. In the second round of the 2008 playoffs, the Jazz lost to the top seeded Los Angeles Lakers in six games.

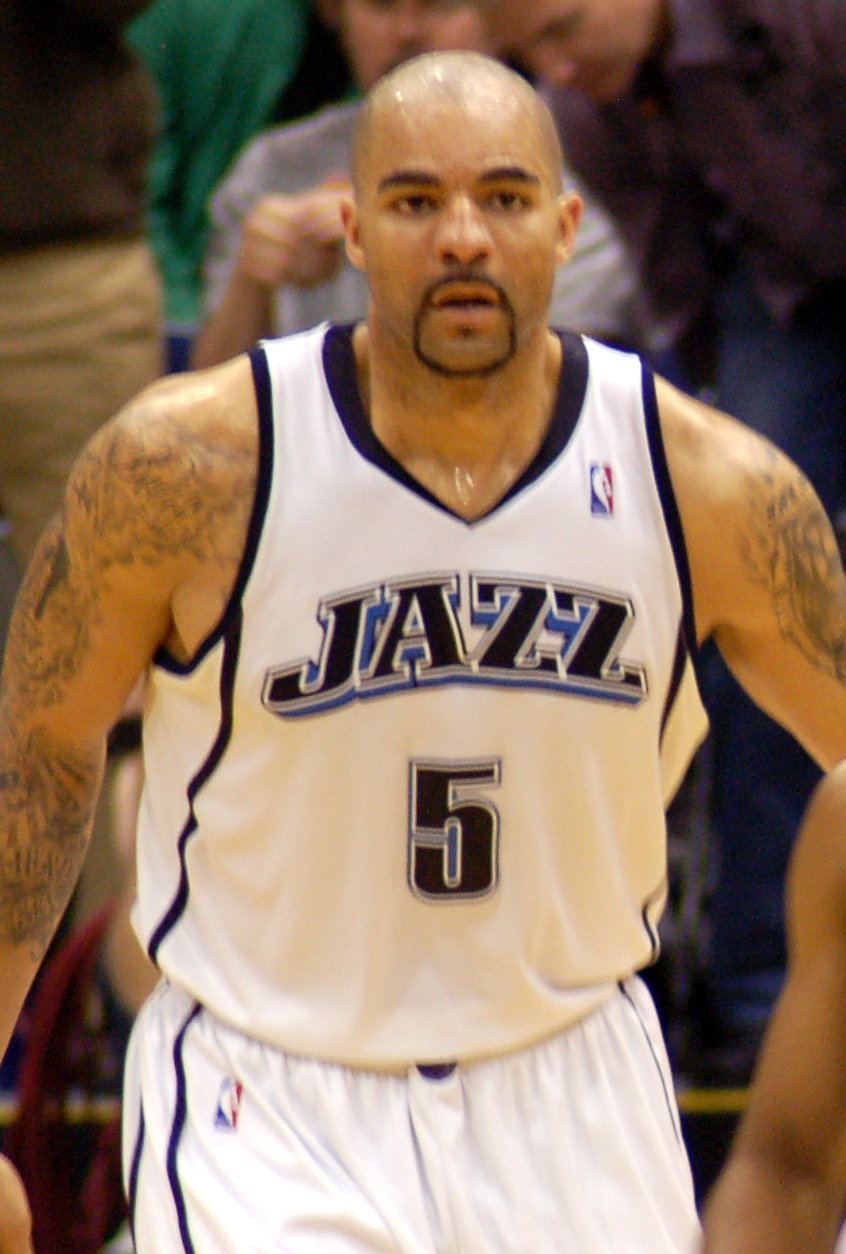
Boozer with the Jazz in 2010

During the 2008–09 season, Boozer's ability to stay healthy was questioned by fans and media alike, as he missed 44 games following arthroscopic left knee surgery. He missed time from late November 2008 to late February 2009. When he played, his numbers were 16.2 points, 10.4 rebounds and 2.3 assists per game, in 37 games (all starts). With his possible pending free agency at the end of the season looming, it seemed likely Boozer would leave. However, when the deadline for choosing free agency or opting into the remaining year came, he surprised many by opting in for the 2009–10 season with the Jazz. The Jazz management stated publicly they were happy to have him return and play for them, and Boozer did the same.

In 2009–10, Boozer played well, averaging 19.5 points and 11.2 rebounds per game, and shot 56.2% from the field, a career high. He played in 78 of 82 games and avoided injury, which boded well heading into the 2010 summer.

=== Chicago Bulls (2010–2014) ===
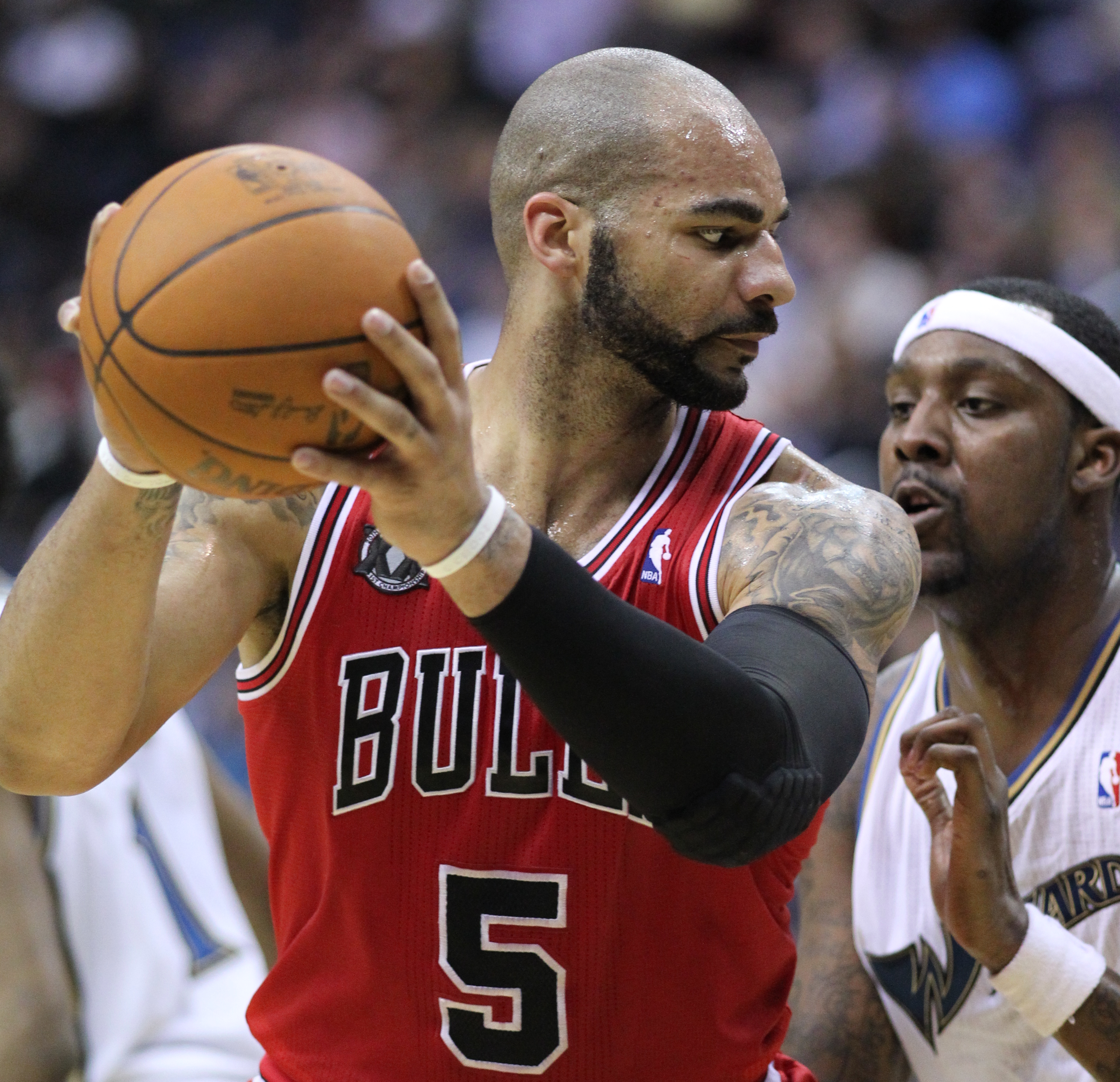
Boozer posting up Andray Blatche in a game for the Bulls in 2011

On July 8, 2010, Boozer, alongside a second-round draft pick was acquired by the Chicago Bulls in a sign-and-trade deal with the Jazz, signing a 5-year, $75 million contract. The Jazz received the draft rights of Mario Austin.

Despite missing 23 games due to injury in 2010–11, Boozer still managed to average 17.5 points and 9.6 rebounds per game while also helping the Bulls get the first seed in the Eastern Conference. His production saw a decline the following year, as he averaged just 15 points and 8.5 rebounds per game (while playing in all 66 games).

Boozer rebounded with a healthy, solid 2012–13 season, averaging 16.2 points and 9.8 rebounds per game while playing in 79 games. On January 16, 2013, Boozer scored a season-high 36 points and grabbed 12 rebounds during a 107–105 overtime victory against the Toronto Raptors.

On July 15, 2014, Boozer was released by the Bulls via the amnesty clause.

=== Los Angeles Lakers (2014–2015) ===
On July 17, 2014, Boozer was claimed off amnesty waivers by the Los Angeles Lakers. The Lakers paid $3.25 million of his $16.8 million salary, while the Bulls paid the remaining $13.55 million. On February 4, 2015, he scored a season-high 28 points in a loss to the Milwaukee Bucks.

Boozer's final NBA game was on April 15, 2015, a 122–99 loss to the Sacramento Kings where he recorded 10 points and six rebounds.

=== Guangdong Southern Tigers (2016–2017) ===
On July 30, 2016, Boozer signed with the Guangdong Southern Tigers of the Chinese Basketball Association. On December 18, 2017, Boozer announced his retirement.

=== BIG3 career ===
On January 25, 2018, Boozer signed with the BIG3 league as a co-captain of the Ghost Ballers. He later was waived and was picked up by 2018 Big3 champions Power.

== Post-playing career ==
Boozer rented his home to Prince during recording sessions of his album 3121 in 2005. Without Boozer's permission, Prince made unauthorized renovations and redecorations, resulting in Boozer nearly suing Prince but once the lease was up, all alterations to the property were reversed.

In May 2025, Boozer joined the Utah Jazz front office.

== NBA career statistics ==
Legend
GP	Games played	GS	Games started	MPG	Minutes per game
FG%	Field goal percentage	3P%	3-point field goal percentage	FT%	Free throw percentage
RPG	Rebounds per game	APG	Assists per game	SPG	Steals per game
BPG	Blocks per game	PPG	Points per game	**Bold**	Career high
*	Led the league

=== Regular season ===
Year	Team	GP	GS	MPG	FG%	3P%	FT%	RPG	APG	SPG	BPG	PPG
2002–03	Cleveland	**81**	54	25.3	.536	.000	**.771**	7.5	1.3	.7	.6	10.0
2003–04	Cleveland	75	75	34.6	.523	**.167**	.768	11.4	2.0	1.0	**.7**	15.5
2004–05	Utah	51	51	34.7	.521	.000	.698	9.0	2.8	.8	.5	17.8
2005–06	Utah	33	19	31.1	.549	.000	.723	8.6	2.7	.9	.2	16.3
2006–07	Utah	74	74	34.6	.561	.000	.685	**11.7**	3.0	.9	.3	20.9
2007–08	Utah	**81**	**81**	**34.9**	.547	.000	.738	10.4	2.9	**1.2**	.5	**21.1**
2008–09	Utah	37	37	32.4	.490	.000	.698	10.4	2.1	1.1	.2	16.2
2009–10	Utah	78	78	34.3	**.562**	.000	.742	11.2	**3.2**	1.1	.5	19.5
2010–11	Chicago	59	59	31.9	.510	.000	.701	9.6	2.5	.8	.3	17.5
2011–12	Chicago	66*	66*	29.5	.532	.000	.693	8.5	1.9	1.0	.4	15.0
2012–13	Chicago	79	79	32.2	.477	.000	.731	9.8	2.3	.8	.4	16.2
2013–14	Chicago	76	76	28.2	.456	.000	.767	8.3	1.6	.7	.3	13.7
2014–15	L.A. Lakers	71	26	23.8	.499	.000	.627	6.8	1.3	.6	.2	11.8
Career		861	775	31.2	.521	.071	.722	9.5	2.2	0.9	0.4	16.2
All-Star		1	0	19.0	.467	.000	.000	10.0	.0	.0	.0	14.0

=== Playoffs ===
Year	Team	GP	GS	MPG	FG%	3P%	FT%	RPG	APG	SPG	BPG	PPG
2007	Utah	**17**	**17**	38.5	**.536**	.000	.738	12.2	2.9	1.0	.3	**23.5**
2008	Utah	12	12	36.8	.415	.000	.714	12.3	2.8	.5	.2	16.0
2009	Utah	5	5	37.2	.528	.000	.771	**13.2**	2.2	**1.6**	.4	20.6
2010	Utah	10	10	**40.2**	.530	.000	.534	**13.2**	**3.0**	.4	**.7**	19.7
2011	Chicago	16	16	31.7	.433	.000	.800	9.7	1.8	.6	.4	12.6
2012	Chicago	6	6	33.3	.422	.000	.714	9.8	**3.0**	.8	.3	13.5
2013	Chicago	12	12	35.9	.494	.000	.689	9.6	1.5	.8	.1	16.4
2014	Chicago	5	5	24.2	.426	.000	**.889**	7.8	1.0	.2	.0	9.6
Career		83	83	35.4	.483	.000	.726	11.1	2.3	.7	.3	17.1

== National team career ==
Boozer was selected as a member of the U.S. Olympic basketball team, which won a bronze medal at the 2004 Summer Olympics. He was also part of the U.S. national team from 2006 to 2008, but did not compete in the 2007 FIBA Americas Championship due to his wife's pregnancy. Boozer participated in the 2008 Summer Olympics as the U.S. national team went unbeaten en route to the gold medal, defeating the 2006 World Champion Spain for their first gold medal since the 2000 Summer Olympics.

== Personal life ==
Boozer has been married twice. He was married to his first wife, Cindy "CeCe" Nichole Blackwell, from 2003 to 2015. Boozer and CeCe have three sons together: Carmani (who had a bone marrow transplant in 2007 to treat sickle-cell disease), and fraternal twins, Cameron and Cayden. Boozer married Aneshka Dawn Smith in 2017. They divorced in 2021. He dated girlfriend Natalie Rodriguez from 2021 to 2024.

Son Cameron Boozer was the number three overall recruit in the 2025 recruiting class. He and his brother Cayden played for Duke University in the 2025–26 season, with Cameron ultimately being drafted by the Memphis Grizzlies in the 2026 NBA draft and Cayden returning to college.

After leaving Duke his junior year to play in the NBA, Carlos Boozer was three classes shy of finishing his degree. In 2020, he officially graduated from Duke, and attended his graduation ceremony (two years later due to the COVID-19 pandemic) on May 8, 2022, alongside his parents, coach, and girlfriend.
