= Tic Price =

American college basketball coach (born 1955)

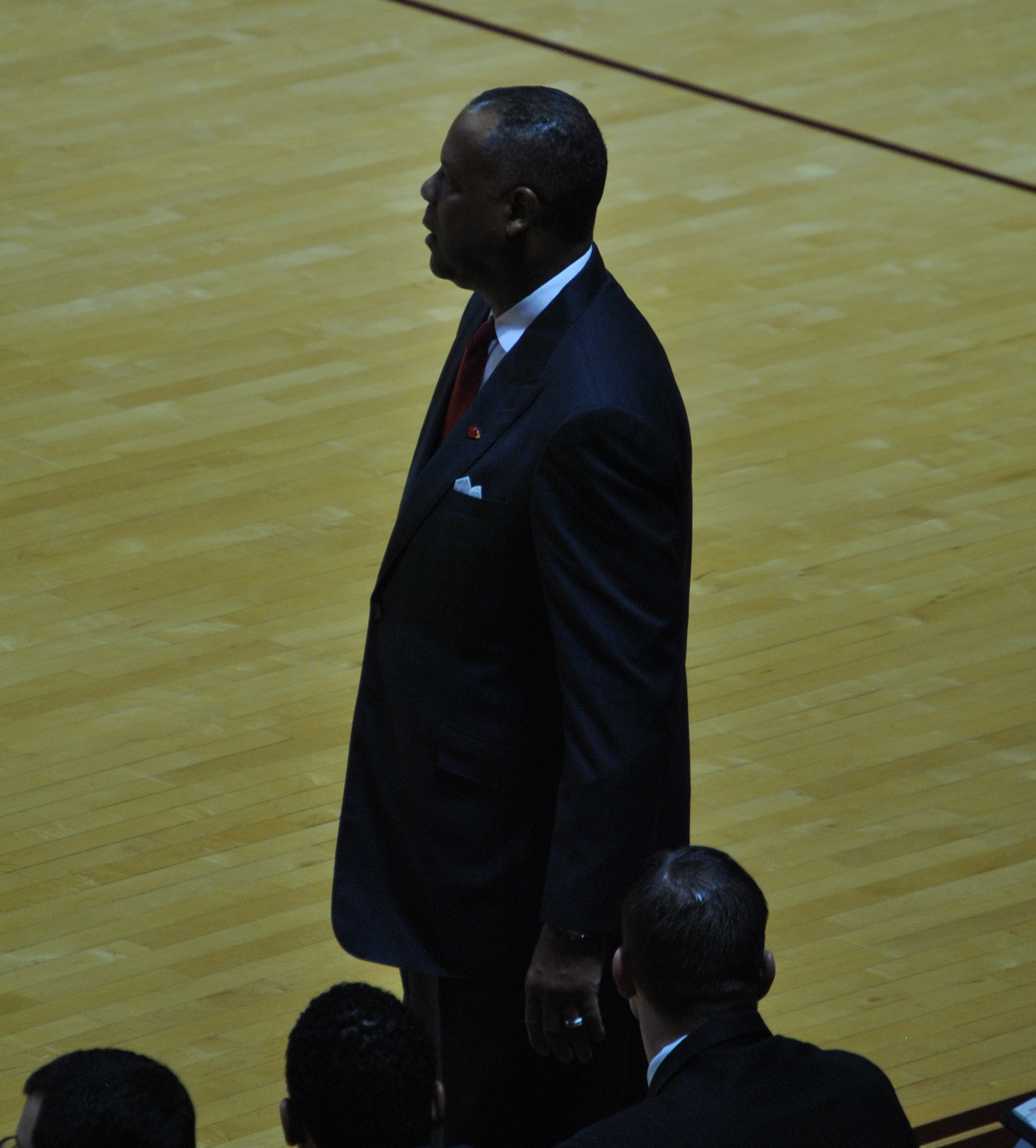

Biographical details
- Born: November 29, 1955 (age 70); Danville, Virginia, U.S.

Playing career
- 1974–1976: VCU
- 1976–1979: Virginia Tech
- Position: Small forward

Coaching career (HC unless noted)
- 1980–1984: Roanoke (assistant)
- 1984–1989: Chattanooga (assistant)
- 1989–1991: Virginia Tech (assistant)
- 1991–1993: Old Dominion (assistant)
- 1993–1994: Auburn (assistant)
- 1994–1997: New Orleans
- 1997–1999: Memphis
- 2000–2001: McNeese State (assistant)
- 2001–2006: McNeese State
- 2007–2008: North Texas (assistant)
- 2008–2011: Lamar (assistant)
- 2014–2021: Lamar

Head coaching record
- Overall: 279–235 (.543)
- Tournaments: 0–2 (NCAA Division I); 1–2 (NIT); 0–2 (CIT)

Accomplishments and honors

Championships
- Sun Belt tournament (1996); 2 Sun Belt regular season (1996, 1997); Southland tournament (2002); Southland regular season (2002)

Awards
- 4x NABC District 8 Coach of the Year (1995, 1996, 1997, 2002); 3× LABC Coach of the Year (1996, 1997, 2002); 3x Louisiana Sports Writers Association Coach of the Year (1996, 1997, 2002); Sun Belt Coach of the Year (1997); Southland Coach of the Year (2002)

George "Tic" Price (born November 29, 1955) is an American college basketball coach with four decades of experience. He last coached the Lamar Cardinals men's basketball team. From 2002 to 2007, he served as head coach at McNeese State. Prior to that, he served as head coach of Memphis and New Orleans.

In addition to his work on the court, Price has also served as a television analyst for ESPN+, the Southland Sports Network and the UNO Privateer Network. In 2022, Price released a book titled Locker Room Talk and now currently serves as the General Manager of Basketball for the Southland Conference.

Price's coaching career spanned 38 years, with the majority of that coming at the NCAA Division I level. During his career, he won more than 200 games and helped coach 13 different squads to the NCAA Championships, NIT or CollegeInsider.com Tournament as either a head or assistant coach.

Price's players reaped the benefits of his guidance. Nine players were named to the All-Southland teams, including three first-team selections. He also coached one SLC Newcomer of the Year to go along with two all-district selections.

During his time as head coach, Price won 10 different coaching honors including SLC Coach of the Year, Sun Belt Coach of the Year, Louisiana Sports Writers Association Collegiate Coach of the Year and NABC District 8 Coach of the Year. Additionally, he has mentored more than a dozen players who went on to successful professional careers both in the NBA and USA Basketball, including Chauncey Billups, Earl Boykin, Bimbo Coles, Austin Croshere, Andre Miller, Brad Miller, Brevin Knight, Wesley Person and Paul Pierce.

Price is married to Jamie Lynn Price, and the couple has two children - son, Ryan, a college basketball coach who played for his father at McNeese, and daughter, Chanel, and four granddaughters – Bella, Cali, Cassie and Capri.

Price's son, Ryan is married to Kali, and daughter, Chanel, is a Sports Illustrated model, who married NFL defensive tackle Davon Godchaux.

== Coaching career ==
=== McNeese State University ===
Price was hired as an assistant at McNeese State in 2000. Prior to the 2001-02 season, Price took over the McNeese program following Ron Everheart leaving to coach Northeastern University. In his first season, he guided the Cowboys to the nation's largest turnaround, posting a 22-9 record, capturing a Southland Conference regular season title, and securing a berth in the NCAA tournament. Price went 74–68 in his five seasons with the Cowboys. His contract was not renewed following the 2006 season.

=== North Texas ===
Price spent one season as an assistant at North Texas in 2007-08.

=== Lamar University ===
Price served as an assistant coach at Lamar from 2008 to 2011. He remained at Lamar as associate vice president of student engagement thereafter. However, on February 16, 2014—with five games to go in the 2013-14 season—Lamar president Kenneth Evans fired head coach Pat Knight and named Price interim head coach for the remainder of the season. Price initially said he had no desire to ever coach again, but Evans told him that it wasn't an offer, but an order. Under Price, the Cardinals finished the 2013-14 season with a 1-4 record (for a team that had won just three games prior to Price taking over). On March 18, 2014, Lamar removed the "interim" tag from Price's title and formally named him as the program's 11th head coach. Price's first full season ended with an overall record of 15-15 and a conference record of 9–9. While not great numbers to the average fan, in just one season under Price the Cardinals more than doubled their overall and conference win totals from the previous two years combined and posted one of the top single-season turnarounds in the country. In 2018-19, Lamar finished tied for third place in the Southland Conference with a 20-13 overall, and 12-6 conference record finishing out the season with nine wins in its final 10 games and 11 wins of its final 13. The 20-win season was the first one for the Cardinals since 2011-12 after missing the 20-win mark by one game the previous two seasons. It was Price's fifth 20-win season as a head coach. The Cardinals nine-game win streak that season was the program's longest since 2007-08 season and the 2018-19 campaign marked the program's third-straight 19-win season - the program's best run of success since winning at least 19 games from the 1982-83 season through 1984-85.

== Head coaching record ==
Record table
Season	Team	Overall	Conference	Standing	Postseason
New Orleans Privateers (Sun Belt Conference) (1994–1997)
1994–95	New Orleans	20–11	13–5	2nd	
1995–96	New Orleans	21–9	14–4	T–1st	NCAA Division I First Round
1996–97	New Orleans	22–7	14–4	T–1st	NIT First Round
New Orleans:		63–27 (.700)	41–13 (.759)		
Memphis Tigers (Conference USA) (1997–1999)
1997–98	Memphis	17–12	12–4	1st (National)	NIT Second Round
1998–99	Memphis	13–15	6–10	T–2nd (National)	
Memphis:		30–27 (.526)	18–14 (.563)		
McNeese State Cowboys (Southland Conference) (2001–2006)
2001–02	McNeese State	21–9	17–3	1st	NCAA Division I First Round
2002–03	McNeese State	15–14	10–10	5th	
2003–04	McNeese State	11–16	7–9	9th	
2004–05	McNeese State	13–15	8–8	6th	
2005–06	McNeese State	14–14	9–7	4th	
McNeese State:		74–68 (.521)	41–37 (.526)		
Lamar Cardinals (Southland Conference) (2014–2021)
2013–14	Lamar	1–4	1–4		
2014–15	Lamar	15–15	9–9	6th	
2015–16	Lamar	11–19	3–15	13th	
2016–17	Lamar	19–15	10–8	T–5th	CIT First Round
2017–18	Lamar	19–14	11–7	T–5th	CIT First Round
2018–19	Lamar	20–13	12–6	T–3rd	
2019–20	Lamar	17–15	10–10	T–6th	
2020–21	Lamar	10–18	6–10	7th	
Lamar:		112–113 (.498)	62–69 (.473)		
Total:		279–235 (.543)			
National champion Postseason invitational champion Conference regular season champion Conference regular season and conference tournament champion Division regular season champion Division regular season and conference tournament champion Conference tournament champion
