= Tevester Anderson =

American basketball player-coach

Biographical details
- Born: February 25, 1937 (age 89)

Coaching career (HC unless noted)
- 1962–1971: Canton HS (MS)
- 1971–1980: West Fulton HS (GA)
- 1980–1981: Towers HS (GA)
- 1982–1986: Auburn (asst.)
- 1987–1995: Georgia (assoc.)
- 1995–1998: Murray State (assoc.)
- 1998–2003: Murray State
- 2003–2013: Jackson State

Head coaching record
- Overall: 252–222 (.532) (college)
- Tournaments: 0–3 (NCAA Division I); 0–1 (NIT)

Accomplishments and honors

Championships
- 2 OVC tournament (1999, 2002); 2 OVC regular season (1999, 2000); SWAC tournament (2007); SWAC regular season (2010)

Awards
- OVC Coach of the Year (1999)

Tevester Anderson (born February 25, 1937) is a retired American college basketball coach and former men's basketball head coach at Jackson State University and Murray State University. He is a native of Canton, Mississippi.

Anderson earned his bachelor's degree in pre-medicine from Arkansas AM&N University (now University of Arkansas at Pine Bluff) in 1962 and, in 1971, earned his master's degree in biological science from North Carolina A&T State University. He began his coaching career at Canton High School, where he served as head basketball coach; he also taught biology.

== Head coaching record ==
Record table
Season	Team	Overall	Conference	Standing	Postseason
Murray State Racers (Ohio Valley Conference) (1998–2003)
1998–99	Murray State	27–6	16–2	1st	NCAA Division I First Round
1999–00	Murray State	23–9	14–4	T–1st	
2000–01	Murray State	17–12	11–5	T–2nd	
2001–02	Murray State	19–13	10–6	3rd	NCAA Division I First Round
2002–03	Murray State	17–12	9–7	T–4th	
Murray State:		103–52 (.665)	60–24 (.714)		
Jackson State Tigers (Southwestern Athletic Conference) (2003–2013)
2003–04	Jackson State	12–17	9–9	T–4th	
2004–05	Jackson State	15–17	10–8	T–5th	
2005–06	Jackson State	15–17	10–8	T–4th	
2006–07	Jackson State	21–14	12–6	2nd	NCAA Division I First Round
2007–08	Jackson State	14–20	10–8	4th	
2008–09	Jackson State	18–15	15–3	2nd	
2009–10	Jackson State	19–13	17–1	1st	NIT First Round
2010–11	Jackson State	17–15	12–6	T–2nd	
2011–12	Jackson State	7–24	5–13	T–8th	
2012–13	Jackson State	11–18	9–9	4th	
Jackson State:		149–170 (.467)	109–71 (.606)		
Total:		252–222 (.532)			
National champion Postseason invitational champion Conference regular season champion Conference regular season and conference tournament champion Division regular season champion Division regular season and conference tournament champion Conference tournament champion
