= 2002 Ohio Valley Conference men's basketball tournament =

- Classification: Division I
- Season: 2001–02
- Teams: 8
- First round site: Campus Sites
- Semifinals site: Kentucky International Convention Center; Louisville, Kentucky
- Finals site: Kentucky International Convention Center; Louisville, Kentucky
- Champions: Murray State (11th title)
- Winning coach: Tevester Anderson (2nd title)
- MVP: Justin Burdine (Murray State)

2001–02 Ohio Valley Conference men's basketball standings
	Conf.				Overall
Team	W		L	PCT	W		L	PCT
Tennessee Tech	15	–	1	.938	27	–	7	.794
Morehead State	11	–	5	.688	18	–	11	.621
Murray State †	10	–	6	.625	19	–	13	.594
Austin Peay	8	–	8	.500	14	–	18	.438
UT Martin	7	–	9	.438	15	–	14	.517
Eastern Illinois	7	–	9	.438	15	–	16	.484
Tennessee State	7	–	9	.438	11	–	17	.393
Southeast Missouri State	4	–	12	.250	6	–	22	.214
Eastern Kentucky	3	–	13	.188	7	–	20	.259
† 2002 OVC tournament winner Rankings from AP Poll

The 2002 Ohio Valley Conference men's basketball tournament was the postseason men's basketball tournament of the Ohio Valley Conference during the 2001–02 NCAA Division I men's basketball season. It was held February 26–March 2, 2002. The first round was hosted by the higher seeded team in each game. The semifinals and finals took place at Kentucky International Convention Center in Louisville, Kentucky.

Third-seeded Murray State won the tournament, defeating Tennessee Tech in the championship game, and received the Ohio Valley's automatic bid to the NCAA tournament. Justin Burdine of Murray State was named the tournament's most valuable player.

== Format ==
The top eight eligible men's basketball teams in the Ohio Valley Conference receive a berth in the conference tournament. After the regular season, teams were seeded by conference record.

== Bracket ==
Quarterfinals; February 26
1	Tennessee Tech	73
8	Southeast Missouri State	56
4	Austin Peay	72
5	UT Martin	69
3	Murray State	103
6	Eastern Illinois	56
2	Morehead State	91
7	Tennessee State	82

Semifinals; March 1
1	Tennessee Tech	86
4	Austin Peay	77
3	Murray State	89
2	Morehead State	75

Finals; March 2
1	Tennessee Tech	69
3	Murray State	70
