= 2001–02 Ole Miss Rebels men's basketball team =

American college basketball season

2001–02 Ole Miss Rebels men's basketball

NCAA tournament, First Round
- Conference: Southeastern Conference
- Record: 20–11 (9–7 SEC)
- Head coach: Rod Barnes (4th season)
- Assistant coaches: Marc Dukes (4th season); Eric Bozeman (4th season); Wayne Brent (4th season)
- Home arena: Tad Smith Coliseum

2001–02 Southeastern Conference men's basketball standings
	Conf.				Overall
Team	W		L	PCT	W		L	PCT
East
No. 15 Florida	10	–	6	.625	22	–	9	.710
No. 16 Kentucky	10	–	6	.625	22	–	10	.688
No. 23 Georgia	10	–	6	.625	22	–	10	.688
Tennessee	7	–	9	.438	15	–	16	.484
South Carolina	6	–	10	.375	22	–	15	.595
Vanderbilt	6	–	10	.375	17	–	15	.531
West
No. 8 Alabama	12	–	4	.750	27	–	8	.771
No. 17 Mississippi State †	10	–	6	.625	27	–	8	.771
Ole Miss	9	–	7	.563	20	–	11	.645
LSU	6	–	10	.375	19	–	15	.559
Arkansas	6	–	10	.375	14	–	15	.483
Auburn	4	–	12	.250	12	–	16	.429
† 2002 SEC tournament winner Rankings from AP Poll

The 2001–02 Ole Miss Rebels men's basketball team represented the University of Mississippi in the 2001–02 NCAA Division I men's basketball season. The Rebels were led by fourth-year head coach, Rod Barnes. The Rebels played their home games at Tad Smith Coliseum in Oxford, Mississippi as members of the Southeastern Conference. This season marked the seventh NCAA Tournament appearance in school history.

== Roster ==
2001–02 Ole Miss Rebels men's basketball team
Players
Coaches

Pos.	#	Name	Height	Weight	Year	Hometown
F	23	Justin Reed	6 ft 8 in (2.03 m)	222 lb (101 kg)	So	Jackson, Mississippi
G/F	5	Aaron Harper	6 ft 7 in (2.01 m)	200 lb (91 kg)	So	Jackson, Mississippi
G	11	Jason Harrison	5 ft 5 in (1.65 m)	155 lb (70 kg)	Sr	Little Rock, Arkansas
G	15	David Sanders	6 ft 3 in (1.91 m)	180 lb (82 kg)	Jr	Jackson, Michigan
G	32	Emmanuel Wade	6 ft 3 in (1.91 m)	185 lb (84 kg)	Jr	Marianna, Arkansas
F/C	31	John Gunn	6 ft 10 in (2.08 m)	250 lb (113 kg)	Jr	Oxford, Michigan
F	45	Richard Kirklin	6 ft 9 in (2.06 m)	205 lb (93 kg)	Jr	Pine Bluff, Arkansas
F	30	Josh Hayes	6 ft 7 in (2.01 m)	195 lb (88 kg)	So	Little Rock, Arkansas
C	54	John Engstrom	7 ft 0 in (2.13 m)	250 lb (113 kg)	Sr	Paragould, Arkansas
G	10	John Pilger	5 ft 10 in (1.78 m)	170 lb (77 kg)	So	Ocean Springs, Mississippi
G	21	Carey Crain	6 ft 0 in (1.83 m)	165 lb (75 kg)	So	Mendenhall, Mississippi
G	24	Syniker Taylor	6 ft 1 in (1.85 m)	205 lb (93 kg)	Jr	Gulfport, Mississippi
F	40	Derrick Allen	6 ft 8 in (2.03 m)	220 lb (100 kg)	Sr	Gadsden, Alabama

Head coach

- Rod Barnes

Assistant coach(es)

- Marc Dukes
- Eric Bozeman
- Wayne Brent

Legend

- (C) Team captain
- (S) Suspended
- (I) Ineligible
- (W) Walk-on
- Injured
- Current redshirt

== Schedule and results ==
Date time, TV	Rank^{#}	Opponent^{#}	Result	Record	Site city, state
Exhibition
Nov 3, 2001*; 12:00 p.m.		Global Basketball	W 68–60		Tad Smith Coliseum; Oxford, MS
Nov 10, 2001*; 2:00 p.m.		Carson–Newman	W 78–70		Tad Smith Coliseum; Oxford, MS
Non-conference regular season
Nov 15, 2001*; 12:00 a.m.		vs. Bowling Green State	L 78–82 ^{OT}	0–1	Carlson Center (3,387); Fairbanks, Alaska
Nov 17, 2001*; 9:00 p.m.		at Alaska-Fairbanks	W 75–58	1–1	Carlson Center (3,333); Fairbanks, Alaska
Nov 18, 2001*; 2:00 p.m.		vs. Wichita State	W 80–68	2–1	Carlson Center (2,092); Fairbanks, Alaska
Nov 24, 2001*; 7:00 p.m.		at Kansas State	W 67–65	3–1	Bramlage Coliseum (8,632); Manhattan, KS
Nov 28, 2001*; 7:00 p.m.		Morris Brown	W 92–45	4–1	Tad Smith Coliseum (3,583); Oxford, MS
Dec 1, 2001*; 6:00 p.m.		George Mason	L 70–71	4–2	Tad Smith Coliseum (4,235); Oxford, MS
Dec 3, 2001*; 7:00 p.m.		Louisiana-Monroe	W 78–43	5–2	Tad Smith Coliseum (2,208); Oxford, MS
Dec 7, 2001*; 8:00 p.m.		No. 22 Memphis	W 71–67	6–2	Tad Smith Coliseum (9,217); Oxford, MS
Dec 16, 2001*; 4:00 p.m.		vs. Tennessee-Martin	W 83–72	7–2	DeSoto Civic Center (5,426); Southaven, MS
Dec 21, 2001*; 10:00 p.m.		vs. IUPUI	W 77–70	8–2	Don Haskins Center (7,434); El Paso, TX
Dec 22, 2001*; 8:30 p.m.		at UTEP	W 68–58	9–2	Don Haskins Center (8,134); El Paso, TX
Dec 29, 2001*; 2:00 p.m.		Arkansas–Pine Bluff	W 95–53	10–2	Tad Smith Coliseum (4,140); Oxford, MS
Jan 2, 2002*; 7:00 p.m.		Lipscomb	W 75–49	11–2	Tad Smith Coliseum (2,575); Oxford, MS
SEC regular season
Jan 6, 2002; 12:30 p.m.		at Tennessee	L 76–82	11–3 (0–1)	Thompson-Boling Arena (12,901); Knoxville, TN
Jan 9, 2002; 7:00 p.m.		Auburn	W 69–65	12–3 (1–1)	Tad Smith Coliseum (7,422); Oxford, MS
Jan 12, 2002; 2:00 p.m.		No. 22 Mississippi State	W 66–59	13–3 (2–1)	Tad Smith Coliseum (9,224); Oxford, MS
Jan 15, 2002; 6:00 p.m.		at No. 12 Kentucky	L 64–87	13–4 (2–2)	Rupp Arena (20,540); Lexington, KY
Jan 19, 2002; 5:00 p.m.		at Arkansas	W 70–64	14–4 (3–2)	Bud Walton Arena (18,437); Fayetteville, AR
Jan 23, 2002; 7:00 p.m.		LSU	W 70–55	15–4 (4–2)	Tad Smith Coliseum (8,184); Oxford, MS
Jan 26, 2002; 12:00 p.m.		South Carolina	W 71–53	16–4 (5–2)	Tad Smith Coliseum (8,667); Oxford, MS
Jan 30, 2002; 7:00 p.m.		Vanderbilt	W 73–61	17–4 (6–2)	Tad Smith Coliseum (8,671); Oxford, MS
Feb 2, 2002; 3:00 p.m.		at No. 16 Georgia	L 72–79	17–5 (6–3)	Stegeman Coliseum (10,523); Athens, GA
Feb 6, 2002; 7:00 p.m.		at No. 5 Alabama	L 59–79	17–6 (6–4)	Coleman Coliseum (10,402); Tuscaloosa, AL
Feb 9, 2002; 12:00 p.m.		Arkansas	W 79–67	18–6 (7–4)	Tad Smith Coliseum (8,559); Oxford, MS
Feb 13, 2002; 7:00 p.m.		at Auburn	L 62–65	18–7 (7–5)	Beard–Eaves–Memorial Coliseum (9,300); Auburn, AL
Feb 16, 2002; 2:00 p.m.		No. 6 Florida	W 68–51	19–7 (8–5)	Tad Smith Coliseum (8,957); Oxford, MS
Feb 23, 2002; 5:00 p.m.		at Mississippi State	L 59–61	19–8 (8–6)	Humphrey Coliseum (10,645); Starkville, MS
Feb 27, 2002; 7:00 p.m.		at LSU	L 56–59	19–9 (8–7)	Maravich Assembly Center (8,468); Baton Rouge, LA
Mar 3, 2002; 1:00 p.m.		No. 6 Alabama	W 84–56	20–9 (9–7)	Tad Smith Coliseum (9,311); Oxford, MS
SEC tournament
Mar 7, 2002*; 8:45 p.m.	(W3)	vs. (E6) South Carolina; First round	L 67–69	20–10	Georgia Dome (16,740); Atlanta, GA
NCAA tournament
Mar 15, 2002*; 9:05 p.m.	(9 W)	vs. (8 W) UCLA; First round	L 58–80	20–11	Mellon Arena (17,015); Pittsburgh, PA
*Non-conference game. ^{#}Rankings from AP Poll. (#) Tournament seedings in parentheses. W=West. All times are in Central Time.
