= 2006–07 Jackson State Tigers basketball team =

American college basketball season

2006–07 Jackson State Tigers basketball

SWAC tournament champions

NCAA tournament, round of 64
- Conference: Southwestern Athletic Conference
- Record: 21–14 (12–6 SWAC)
- Head coach: Tevester Anderson (4th season)
- Assistant coach: Anthony Boone (4th season)
- Home arena: Williams Assembly Center

2006–07 SWAC men's basketball standings
	Conf.				Overall
Team	W		L	PCT	W		L	PCT
Mississippi Valley State	13	–	5	.722	18	–	16	.529
Jackson State †	12	–	6	.667	21	–	14	.600
Grambling State	10	–	8	.556	12	–	14	.462
Alcorn State	10	–	8	.556	11	–	19	.367
Texas Southern	9	–	9	.500	14	–	17	.452
Arkansas–Pine Bluff	9	–	9	.500	12	–	19	.387
Southern	9	–	9	.500	10	–	21	.323
Alabama State	8	–	10	.444	10	–	20	.333
Prairie View A&M	6	–	12	.333	8	–	22	.267
Alabama A&M	4	–	14	.222	10	–	20	.333
† 2007 SWAC tournament winner Rankings from AP Poll

The 2006–07 Jackson State Tigers basketball team represented Jackson State University in the 2006–07 NCAA Division I men's basketball season. The Tigers, led by 11th-year head coach Tevester Anderson, played their home games at the Williams Assembly Center in Jackson, Mississippi as members of the Southwestern Athletic Conference. After finishing the conference regular season tied for second in the standings, Jackson State won the SWAC tournament to receive an automatic bid to the NCAA tournament. As No. 16 seed in the Midwest region, the Tigers were beaten by No. 1 seed and eventual National champion Florida in the opening round.

To date, this is the most recent appearance in the NCAA Tournament for the Jackson State basketball program.

== Roster ==
2006–07 Jackson State Tigers men's basketball team
Players	Coaches
Pos. / # / Name / Height / Weight / Year / Hometown; G / 24 / Trey Johnson / 6 ft 5 in (1.96 m) / 218 lb (99 kg) / Sr / Jackson, Mississippi	Head coach: Tevester Anderson; Assistant coach(es): Anthony Boone (Mississippi); Legend: (C) Team captain; (S) Suspended; (I) Ineligible; (W) Walk-on; Injured; Current redshirt; Roster

== Schedule and results ==
Date time, TV	Rank^{#}	Opponent^{#}	Result	Record	Site (attendance) city, state
Non-conference regular season
Nov 10, 2006*		at No. 11 Alabama	L 65–96	0–1	Coleman Coliseum; Tuscaloosa, Alabama
Nov 13, 2006*		at No. 23 Georgia Tech	L 70–100	0–2	Alexander Memorial Coliseum; Atlanta, Georgia
Nov 15, 2006*		at Illinois	L 55–76	0–3	Assembly Hall; Champaign, Illinois
Nov 16, 2006*		at No. 13 Memphis	L 69–111	0–4	FedExForum; Memphis, Tennessee
Nov 21, 2006*		at Rutgers	W 71–70	1–4	Louis Brown Athletic Center; Piscataway, New Jersey
Dec 22, 2006*		at UTEP	W 100–97	6–6	Don Haskins Center; El Paso, Texas
Dec 23, 2006*		vs. Drake	L 70–71	6–7	Don Haskins Center; El Paso, Texas
SWAC regular season
Jan 2, 2007		at Alabama State	W 81–68	7–7 (1–0)	Dunn–Oliver Acadome; Montgomery, Alabama
Mar 3, 2007		Alabama A&M	W 81–70	18–13 (12–6)	Williams Assembly Center; Jackson, Mississippi
SWAC tournament
Mar 7, 2007*		vs. Southern; Quarterfinals	W 74–65	19–13	Bill Harris Arena; Birmingham, Alabama
Mar 9, 2007*		vs. Arkansas-Pine Bluff; Semifinals	W 64–62	20–13	Bill Harris Arena; Birmingham, Alabama
Mar 10, 2007*		vs. Mississippi Valley State; Championship game	W 81–71	21–13	Bill Harris Arena; Birmingham, Alabama
NCAA tournament
Mar 16, 2007*; CBS	(16 MW)	vs. (1 MW) No. 3 Florida; First Round	L 69–112	21–14	New Orleans Arena; New Orleans, Louisiana
*Non-conference game. ^{#}Rankings from AP Poll. (#) Tournament seedings in parentheses. MW=Midwest. All times are in Central.

== Awards and honors ==
- Trey Johnson – SWAC Player of the Year
