= 2001–02 McNeese State Cowboys basketball team =

American college basketball season

2001–02 McNeese State Cowboys basketball

Southland tournament champions Southland regular season champions

NCAA tournament, First Round
- Conference: Southland Conference
- Record: 21–9 (17–3 Southland)
- Head coach: Tic Price (1st season)
- Home arena: Burton Coliseum

2001–02 Southland Conference men's basketball standings
| | Conf. | | | | Overall |
| Team | W | | L | PCT | W | | L | PCT |
|---|---|---|---|---|---|---|---|---|
| McNeese State † | 17 | – | 3 | .850 | 21 | – | 9 | .700 |
| Louisiana–Monroe | 15 | – | 5 | .750 | 20 | – | 12 | .625 |
| UTSA | 13 | – | 7 | .650 | 19 | – | 10 | .655 |
| Lamar | 11 | – | 9 | .550 | 15 | – | 14 | .517 |
| Stephen F. Austin | 10 | – | 10 | .500 | 13 | – | 15 | .464 |
| Southwest Texas State | 10 | – | 10 | .500 | 12 | – | 16 | .429 |
| Sam Houston State | 9 | – | 11 | .450 | 14 | – | 14 | .500 |
| Texas–Arlington | 9 | – | 11 | .450 | 12 | – | 15 | .444 |
| Northwestern State | 9 | – | 11 | .450 | 13 | – | 18 | .419 |
| Southeastern Louisiana | 6 | – | 14 | .300 | 7 | – | 20 | .259 |
| Nicholls State | 1 | – | 19 | .050 | 2 | – | 25 | .074 |
† 2002 Southland Conference tournament winner Rankings from AP Poll

The 2001–02 McNeese State Cowboys basketball team represented the McNeese State University during the 2001–02 NCAA Division I men's basketball season. The Cowboys, led by first-year head coach Tic Price, played their home games at Burton Coliseum and were members of the Southland Conference. They finished the season with a record of 21–9, 17–3 in Southland play. They won the 2002 Southland Conference men's basketball tournament to earn an automatic bid in the 2002 NCAA Division I men's basketball tournament as No. 14 seed in the Midwest region. They lost in the first round to No. 3 seed Mississippi State, 70–58.

== Roster ==
2001–02 McNeese State Cowboys men's basketball team
Players
Coaches

| Pos. | # | Name | Height | Weight | Year | Hometown |
|---|---|---|---|---|---|---|
| G | 3 | Jason Coleman | 6 ft 4 in (1.93 m) | 180 lb (82 kg) | Jr | Brooklyn, New York |
| F | 45 | Fred Gentry | 6 ft 8 in (2.03 m) | 225 lb (102 kg) | Sr | DeQuincy, Louisiana |

Head coach

- Tic Price

Assistant coach(es)

Legend

- (C) Team captain
- (S) Suspended
- (I) Ineligible
- (W) Walk-on
- Injured
- Current redshirt

Roster

== Schedule and results ==
| Date time, TV | Rank^{#} | Opponent^{#} | Result | Record | Site (attendance) city, state |
Regular season
| Nov 17, 2001* | | at Louisiana–Lafayette | L 69–76 | 0–1 | Cajundome (3,543); Lafayette, Louisiana |
| Nov 19, 2001* | | Loyola (LA) | W 88–46 | 1–1 | Burton Coliseum; Lake Charles, Louisiana |
| Nov 27, 2001* | | at Auburn | L 74–78 | 1–2 | Beard–Eaves–Memorial Coliseum; Auburn, Alabama |
| Nov 29, 2001* | | at No. 21 Alabama | L 61–90 | 1–3 | Coleman Coliseum; Tuscaloosa, Alabama |
| Dec 1, 2001*; 7:00 p.m. | | at Louisiana–Monroe | L 73–79 | 1–4 | Fant–Ewing Coliseum; Monroe, Louisiana |
| Dec 3, 2001* | | Nicholls State | W 67–60 | 2–4 | Burton Coliseum; Lake Charles, Louisiana |
| Dec 5, 2001* | | at Jackson State | W 70–63 | 3–4 | Williams Assembly Center; Jackson, Mississippi |
| Dec 8, 2001* | | Southwest Texas State | W 76–66 | 4–4 | Burton Coliseum; Lake Charles, Louisiana |
| Dec 15, 2001* | | at LSU | L 57–80 | 4–5 | Pete Maravich Assembly Center; Baton Rouge, Louisiana |
| Dec 19, 2001*; 7:00 p.m., FSNSW | | at Texas | L 67–80 | 4–6 | Frank Erwin Center; Austin, Texas |
| Dec 22, 2001 | | Southeastern Louisiana | W 68–63 | 5–6 (1–0) | Burton Coliseum; Lake Charles, Louisiana |
| Dec 29, 2001 | | UTSA | W 71–55 | 6–6 (2–0) | Burton Coliseum; Lake Charles, Louisiana |
| Jan 3, 2002; 1:00 p.m. | | at Sam Houston State | L 75–76 ^{OT} | 6–7 (2–1) | Bernard Johnson Coliseum; Huntsville, Texas |
| Jan 5, 2002 | | at Lamar | W 73–65 | 7–7 (3–1) | Montagne Center; Beaumont, Texas |
| Jan 10, 2002 | | at UTSA | L 73–81 | 7–8 (3–2) | Convocation Center; San Antonio, Texas |
| Jan 12, 2002 | | at Southwest Texas State | W 76–71 | 8–8 (4–2) | Strahan Arena; San Marcos, Texas |
| Jan 14, 2002; 7:00 p.m. | | Louisiana–Monroe | W 66–55 | 9–8 (5–2) | Burton Coliseum; Lake Charles, Louisiana |
| Jan 19, 2002 | | Texas–Arlington | W 67–61 | 10–8 (6–2) | Burton Coliseum; Lake Charles, Louisiana |
| Jan 26, 2002 | | at Southeastern Louisiana | W 60–58 | 11–8 (7–2) | University Center; Hammond, Louisiana |
| Jan 28, 2002 | | at Nicholls State | W 74–46 | 12–8 (8–2) | Stopher Gymnasium; Thibodaux, Louisiana |
| Feb 2, 2002 | | at Northwestern State | W 67–63 | 13–8 (9–2) | Prather Coliseum; Natchitoches, Louisiana |
| Feb 9, 2002 | | at Stephen F. Austin | W 65–49 | 14–8 (10–2) | William R. Johnson Coliseum; Nacogdoches, Texas |
| Feb 11, 2002 | | at Texas–Arlington | W 81–74 | 15–8 (11–2) | Texas Hall; Arlington, Texas |
| Feb 21, 2002 | | Lamar | W 74–46 | 16–8 (12–2) | Burton Coliseum; Lake Charles, Louisiana |
| Feb 23, 2002; 1:00 p.m. | | Sam Houston State | W 79–68 | 17–8 (13–2) | Burton Coliseum; Lake Charles, Louisiana |
| Feb 28, 2002 | | Northwestern State | W 75–53 | 18–8 (14–2) | Burton Coliseum; Lake Charles, Louisiana |
| Mar 2, 2002 | | Stephen F. Austin | W 62–37 | 19–8 (15–2) | Burton Coliseum; Lake Charles, Louisiana |
Southland tournament
| Mar 6, 2002* | (1) | (4) Lamar; Semifinals | W 71–57 | 20–8 | Burton Coliseum (5,819); Lake Charles, Louisiana |
| Mar 9, 2002*; 11:00 a.m. | (1) | (2) Louisiana-Monroe; Championship game | W 65–43 | 21–8 | Burton Coliseum (6,025); Lake Charles, Louisiana |
NCAA tournament
| Mar 15, 2002* | (14 MW) | vs. (3 MW) No. 17 Mississippi State; First round | L 58–70 | 21–9 | American Airlines Center; Dallas, Texas |
*Non-conference game. ^{#}Rankings from AP Poll. (#) Tournament seedings in parentheses. MW=Midwest. All times are in Central Time.
