= 2002 Sun Belt Conference men's basketball tournament =

- Classification: Division I
- Season: 2001–02
- Teams: 11
- Site: Lakefront Arena; New Orleans, LA
- Champions: Western Kentucky (4th title)
- Winning coach: Dennis Felton (2nd title)
- MVP: Derek Robinson (Western Kentucky)

2001–02 Sun Belt Conference men's basketball standings
	Conf.				Overall
Team	W		L	PCT	W		L	PCT
East
No. 19 Western Kentucky †	13	–	1	.929	28	–	4	.875
Arkansas-Little Rock	8	–	6	.571	18	–	11	.621
Middle Tennessee	6	–	8	.429	14	–	15	.483
Arkansas State	5	–	9	.357	15	–	16	.484
Florida International	4	–	10	.286	10	–	20	.333
West
Louisiana–Lafayette	11	–	4	.733	20	–	11	.645
New Mexico State	11	–	4	.733	20	–	12	.625
New Orleans	9	–	6	.600	15	–	14	.517
North Texas	8	–	7	.533	15	–	14	.517
Denver	3	–	12	.200	8	–	20	.286
South Alabama	2	–	13	.133	7	–	21	.250
† 2002 Sun Belt Conference tournament winner Rankings from AP poll

The 2002 Sun Belt Conference men's basketball tournament was held March 1–5 at the Lakefront Arena at the University of New Orleans in New Orleans, Louisiana.

The top-seed in the East division Western Kentucky defeated West division top-seed Louisiana–Lafayette in the championship game, 76–70, to win their fourth Sun Belt men's basketball tournament.

The Hilltoppers, in turn, received an automatic bid to the 2002 NCAA tournament as the #9 seed in the Midwest region. No other Sun Belt members earned bids to the tournament.

== Format ==
All eleven participating Sun Belt members were seeded based on regular season conference records, with the five highest-seeded teams were awarded byes into the quarterfinal round while the six lowest-seeded teams entered the bracket in the preliminary first round.

== Bracket ==
First round Friday, March 1
5W	Florida International	71
4W	North Texas	84
6W	South Alabama	47
3E	Middle Tennessee	48
4E	Arkansas State	58
5W	Denver	53

Quarterfinals; Saturday, March 2 Sunday, March 3
1E	#20 Western Kentucky	82
4W	North Texas	68
3E	Middle Tennessee	48
2W	New Mexico State	63
2E	Arkansas–Little Rock	71
3W	New Orleans	67
4E	Arkansas State	59
1W	Louisiana–Lafayette	74

Semifinals; Monday, March 4
1E	#20 Western Kentucky	73
2W	New Mexico State	72
2E	Arkansas–Little Rock	53
1W	Louisiana–Lafayette	67

Championship; Tuesday, March 5
1E	#20 Western Kentucky	76
1W	Louisiana–Lafayette	70

== See also ==
- Sun Belt Conference women's basketball tournament
