= 2001–02 Florida Gators men's basketball team =

American college basketball season

2001–02 Florida Gators men's basketball

SEC Eastern Division champions

NCAA tournament, Round of 64
- Conference: Southeastern Conference
- East

Ranking
- Coaches: No. 23
- AP: No. 15
- Record: 22–9 (10–6 SEC)
- Head coach: Billy Donovan (6th season)
- Assistant coach: John Pelphrey; Anthony Grant; Donnie Jones
- Home arena: O'Connell Center

2001–02 Southeastern Conference men's basketball standings
	Conf.				Overall
Team	W		L	PCT	W		L	PCT
East
No. 15 Florida	10	–	6	.625	22	–	9	.710
No. 16 Kentucky	10	–	6	.625	22	–	10	.688
No. 23 Georgia	10	–	6	.625	22	–	10	.688
Tennessee	7	–	9	.438	15	–	16	.484
South Carolina	6	–	10	.375	22	–	15	.595
Vanderbilt	6	–	10	.375	17	–	15	.531
West
No. 8 Alabama	12	–	4	.750	27	–	8	.771
No. 17 Mississippi State †	10	–	6	.625	27	–	8	.771
Ole Miss	9	–	7	.563	20	–	11	.645
LSU	6	–	10	.375	19	–	15	.559
Arkansas	6	–	10	.375	14	–	15	.483
Auburn	4	–	12	.250	12	–	16	.429
† 2002 SEC tournament winner Rankings from AP Poll

The 2001–02 Florida Gators men's basketball team represented the University of Florida in the sport of basketball during the 2001–02 college basketball season. The Gators competed in Division I of the National Collegiate Athletic Association (NCAA) and the Eastern Division of the Southeastern Conference (SEC). They were led by head coach Billy Donovan, and played their home games in the O'Connell Center on the university's Gainesville, Florida campus.

The Gators were the SEC Eastern Division champions, winning a share of the division title for the third straight season. They earned a No. 5 seed in the 2002 NCAA tournament, falling to Creighton in the first round in double overtime. It was the first time in Gators basketball history that the team advanced to the NCAA Tournament for a fourth consecutive year.

== Roster ==
Name	Number	Position	Height	Weight	Class	Hometown
Matt Bonner	15	F	6–10	237	Junior	Concord, NH
Max Booker	21	G	6–2	175	Freshman	Atlanta, Georgia
Bonell Colas	42	F	6–9	225	Freshman	Miami, Florida
Orien Greene	1	G	6–4	208	Sophomore	Gainesville, Florida
Seth Haimovitch	3	G	6–1	200	Junior	Coral Springs, Florida
LaDarius Halton	23	F	6–4	200	Junior	New Smyrna Beach, Florida
Justin Hamilton	12	G	6–3	207	Sophomore	Sarasota, Florida
Udonis Haslem	50	C	6–9	246	Senior	Miami, Florida
Ronnie King	50	G	5–11	178	Senior	Brandon, Florida
David Lee	24	F	6–4	182	Freshman	St. Louis, Missouri
Brett Nelson	10	G	6–4	182	Sophomore	St. Albans, West Virginia
James White	21	G/F	6–7	200	Freshman	Kensington, Maryland

=== Coaches ===
Name	Position	College	Graduating year
Billy Donovan	Head coach	Providence College	1987
John Pelphrey	Assistant coach	University of Kentucky	1992
Anthony Grant	Assistant coach	Dayton	1987
Donnie Jones	Assistant coach	Pikeville	1988

== Schedule and results ==
Date time, TV	Rank^{#}	Opponent^{#}	Result	Record	Site city, state
Exhibition
Nov 1, 2001*; 7:00 p.m.		Birmingham (England)	W 108–85		Stephen C. O'Connell Center (6,111); Gainesville, Florida
Nov 19, 2001*; 7:00 p.m.		EA Sports All Stars	L 96–100		Stephen C. O'Connell Center (6,135); Gainesville, Florida
Regular Season
Nov 8, 2001*; 6:30 p.m.	No. 6	vs. No. 16 Temple; Coaches vs Cancer IKON Classic	W 72–64	1–0	Madison Square Garden; New York, New York
Nov 9, 2001*; 9:00 p.m., ESPN	No. 6	vs. Arizona; Coaches vs Cancer IKON Classic	L 71–75	1–1	Madison Square Garden (15,404); New York, New York
Nov 16, 2001*; 7:00 p.m.	No. 6	Florida State	W 68–47	2–1	Stephen C. O'Connell Center (12,109); Gainesville, Florida
Nov 28, 2001*; 7:00 p.m.	No. 6	at New Hampshire	W 108–56	3–1	Whittemore Center (7,272); Durham, New Hampshire
Dec 2, 2001*; 1:00 p.m.	No. 6	Tulane	W 81–65	4–1	Stephen C. O'Connell Center (8,244); Gainesville, Florida
Dec 5, 2001*; 7:00 p.m.	No. 6	No. 24 Michigan State	W 74–70	5–1	Stephen C. O'Connell Center (12,422); Gainesville, Florida
Dec 8, 2001*; 2:00 p.m.	No. 6	at South Florida	W 92–73	6–1	Sun Dome (10,444); Tampa, Florida
Dec 15, 2001*; 7:00 p.m.	No. 5	vs. Charlotte; Orange Bowl Basketball Classic	W 73–52	7–1	American Airlines Arena (5,883); Miami, Florida
Dec 18, 2001*; 7:30 p.m.	No. 4	High Point	W 103–49	8–1	Stephen C. O'Connell Center (7,848); Gainesville, Florida
Dec 22, 2001*; 3:00 p.m.	No. 4	New Orleans	W 76–60	9–1	Stephen C. O'Connell Center (8,935); Gainesville, Florida
Dec 28, 2001*; 1:00 p.m.	No. 3	Stetson	W 94–66	10–1	Stephen C. O'Connell Center (8,722); Gainesville, Florida
Dec 30, 2001*; 2:00 p.m.	No. 3	Belmont	W 107–55	11–1	Stephen C. O'Connell Center (7,482); Gainesville, Florida
Jan 5, 2002; 12:00 p.m.	No. 3	South Carolina	W 69–60	12–1 (1–0)	Stephen C. O'Connell Center (11,007); Gainesville, Florida
Jan 9, 2002; 8:00 p.m.	No. 3	at Tennessee	W 104–100	13–1 (2–0)	Thompson–Boling Arena (16,756); Knoxville, Tennessee
Jan 12, 2002; 1:00 p.m.	No. 3	at Vanderbilt	W 95–85	14–1 (3–0)	Memorial Gymnasium (13,172); Nashville, Tennessee
Jan 16, 2002; 7:00 p.m.	No. 2	LSU	W 102–70	15–1 (4–0)	Stephen C. O'Connell Center (12,447); Gainesville, Florida
Jan 19, 2002; 12:00 p.m.	No. 2	No. 20 Georgia	L 79–84	15–2 (4–1)	Stephen C. O'Connell Center (12,375); Gainesville, Florida
Jan 26, 2002; 1:00 p.m., JP Sports	No. 5	at Arkansas	L 92–94 ^{OT}	15–3 (4–2)	Bud Walton Arena (19,182); Fayetteville, Arkansas
Jan 29, 2002; 9:00 p.m., ESPN	No. 5	No. 10 Kentucky	L 68–70	15–4 (4–3)	Stephen C. O'Connell Center (12,212); Gainesville, Florida
Feb 2, 2002; 5:00 p.m.	No. 5	Mississippi State	W 76–48	16–4 (5–3)	Stephen C. O'Connell Center (12,396); Gainesville, Florida
Feb 5, 2002; 7:00 p.m.	No. 8	at South Carolina	W 72–63	17–4 (6–3)	Frank McGuire Arena (11,209); Columbia, South Carolina
Feb 9, 2002; 5:00 p.m.	No. 8	Vanderbilt	W 80–54	18–4 (7–3)	Stephen C. O'Connell Center (12,497); Gainesville, Florida
Feb 12, 2002; 9:00 p.m.	No. 6	at Georgia	W 85–70	19–4 (8–3)	Stegeman Coliseum (10,523); Athens, Georgia
Feb 16, 2002; 3:00 p.m.	No. 6	at Ole Miss	L 51–68	19–5 (8–4)	Tad Smith Coliseum (8,957); Oxford, Mississippi
Feb 20, 2002; 8:00 p.m.	No. 8	Auburn	W 89–61	20–5 (9–4)	Stephen C. O'Connell Center (11,311); Gainesville, Florida
Feb 23, 2002; 2:00 p.m.	No. 8	at No. 5 Alabama	L 64–65	20–6 (9–5)	Coleman Coliseum (15,316); Tuscaloosa, Alabama
Feb 26, 2002; 9:00 p.m.	No. 8	Tennessee	W 68–62	21–6 (10–5)	Stephen C. O'Connell Center (12,062); Gainesville, Florida
Mar 2, 2002; 12:00 p.m., CBS	No. 8	at No. 11 Kentucky	L 67–70	21–7 (10–6)	Rupp Arena (23,606); Lexington, Kentucky
SEC Tournament
Mar 7, 2002*; 7:30 p.m.	(E3) No. 11	vs. (W6) Auburn; First round	W 81–63	22–7	Georgia Dome; Atlanta, Georgia
Mar 8, 2002*; 7:30 p.m.	(E3) No. 11	vs. (W2) Mississippi State; Quarterfinals	L 52–62	22–8	Georgia Dome (22,508); Atlanta, Georgia
NCAA Tournament
Mar 15, 2002*; 12:30 p.m., CBS	(5 MW) No. 15	vs. (12 MW) Creighton; First round	L 82–83 ^{2OT}	22–9	United Center; Chicago, Illinois
*Non-conference game. ^{#}Rankings from AP Poll. (#) Tournament seedings in parentheses. MW=Midwest. All times are in Eastern Time.
