= 2001–02 Arkansas Razorbacks men's basketball team =

American college basketball season

2001–02 Arkansas Razorbacks men's basketball
- Conference: Southeastern Conference
- West
- Record: 14–15 (6–10 SEC)
- Head coach: Nolan Richardson (fired March 1st) (17th season); Mike Anderson (Interim)
- Home arena: Bud Walton Arena

2001–02 Southeastern Conference men's basketball standings
	Conf.				Overall
Team	W		L	PCT	W		L	PCT
East
No. 15 Florida	10	–	6	.625	22	–	9	.710
No. 16 Kentucky	10	–	6	.625	22	–	10	.688
No. 23 Georgia	10	–	6	.625	22	–	10	.688
Tennessee	7	–	9	.438	15	–	16	.484
South Carolina	6	–	10	.375	22	–	15	.595
Vanderbilt	6	–	10	.375	17	–	15	.531
West
No. 8 Alabama	12	–	4	.750	27	–	8	.771
No. 17 Mississippi State †	10	–	6	.625	27	–	8	.771
Ole Miss	9	–	7	.563	20	–	11	.645
LSU	6	–	10	.375	19	–	15	.559
Arkansas	6	–	10	.375	14	–	15	.483
Auburn	4	–	12	.250	12	–	16	.429
† 2002 SEC tournament winner Rankings from AP Poll

The 2001–02 Arkansas Razorbacks men's basketball team represented the University of Arkansas in the 2001–02 college basketball season. The head coach was Nolan Richardson, serving for his 17th year. However, with two games remaining in the regular season, Richardson was fired after making some challenging remarks towards Arkansas long-time athletic director Frank Broyles. Assistant head coach Mike Anderson became the interim head coach for the remainder of the season. The team played its home games in Bud Walton Arena in Fayetteville, Arkansas.

== Schedule ==
Date time, TV	Rank^{#}	Opponent^{#}	Result	Record	Site (attendance) city, state
11/12/01*; 7:00 pm, Pre-Season NIT		Maine	W 63–47	1–0	Bud Walton Arena (10,107); Fayetteville, Arkansas
11/16/01*; 6:00 pm, ESPN		Wake Forest; Pre-Season NIT	L 71–76	1–1	Bud Walton Arena (17,820); Fayetteville, Arkansas
11/18/01*; 1:00 pm, ARSN		Oral Roberts	W 71–57	2–1	Bud Walton Arena (12,944); Fayetteville, Arkansas
11/28/01*; 7:00 pm, ARSN		at Tulsa	W 79–75	3–1	Reynolds Center (8,355); Tulsa, Oklahoma
11/30/01*; 7:00 pm, ESPN2		Oklahoma	L 54–69	3–2	Bud Walton Arena (19,419); Fayetteville, Arkansas
12/4/01*; 7:00 pm, ARSN		SW Texas State	W 90–68	4–2	Bud Walton Arena (8,940); Fayetteville, Arkansas
12/8/01*; 11:00 am, ESPN		at Illinois	L 91–94	4–3	United Center (18,671); Chicago
12/10/01*; 7:00 pm, FSN		UNC Greensboro	W 89–74	5–3	Bud Walton Arena (11,427); Fayetteville, Arkansas
12/20/01*; 7:00 pm, ARSN		UT-Chattanooga	W 98–84	6–3	Bud Walton Arena (14,552); Fayetteville, Arkansas
12/22/01*; 1:00 pm, ARSN		No. 6 Oklahoma State	L 76–85	6–4	Alltel Arena (17,021); North Little Rock, Arkansas
12/29/01*; 2:00 pm, ARSN		Elon	W 96–52	7–4	Bud Walton Arena (11,149); Fayetteville, Arkansas
1/2/02*; 8:30 pm, ESPN2		at Memphis	W 90–73	8–4	Pyramid Arena (20,004); Memphis, Tennessee
1/5/02; 4:00 pm, FSN		at Auburn	W 83–77	9–4	Beard-Eaves-Memorial Coliseum (9,300); Auburn, AL
1/8/02; 8:00 pm, ESPN		No. 22 Mississippi State	W 75–64	10–4	Bud Walton Arena (18,037); Fayetteville, Arkansas
1/13/02; 12:30 pm, JP Sports		at LSU	L 69–75	10–5	Maravich Assembly Center (8,369); Baton Rouge, Louisiana
1/16/02; 7:00 pm		South Carolina	L 60–62	10–6	Bud Walton Arena (17,634); Fayetteville, Arkansas
1/19/02; 5:00 pm, FSN		Mississippi	L 64–70	10–7	Bud Walton Arena (18,437); Fayetteville, Arkansas
1/23/02; 6:30 pm		at Georgia	L 67–81	10–8	Stegeman Coliseum (10,323); Athens, Georgia
1/26/02; 12:00 pm, CBS		No. 4 Florida	W 94–92 ^{OT}	11–8	Bud Walton Arena (19,182); Fayetteville, Arkansas
1/30/02; 7:00 pm		at No. 7 Alabama	L 94–109	11–9	Coleman Coliseum (12,510); Tuscaloosa, AL
2/2/02; 12:00 pm, JP Sports		Auburn	W 62–60	12–9	Bud Walton Arena (17,238); Fayetteville, Arkansas
2/9/02; 12:00 pm, JP Sports		at Mississippi	L 67–79	12–10	Tad Smith Coliseum (8,559); Oxford, Mississippi
2/13/02; 7:00 pm, JP Sports		at Tennessee	L 53–64	12–11	Thompson–Boling Arena (14,141); Knoxville, Tennessee
2/16/02; 2:00 pm		LSU	L 63–67	12–12	Bud Walton Arena (18,716); Fayetteville, Arkansas
2/20/02; 7:00 pm, JP Sports		No. 5 Alabama	W 67–59	13–12	Bud Walton Arena (17,478); Fayetteville, Arkansas
2/23/02; 11:00 am, CBS		at No. 12 Kentucky	L 58–71	13–13	Rupp Arena (22,109); Lexington, Kentucky
2/27/02; 7:00 pm, JP Sports		at Mississippi State	L 83–89	13–14	Humphrey Coliseum (6,806); Starkville, Mississippi
3/2/02; 2:00 pm		Vanderbilt	W 81–67	14–14	Bud Walton Arena (7,953); Fayetteville, Arkansas
2002 SEC men's basketball tournament
3/7/02; 2:15 pm, JP Sports		vs. Tennessee	L 61–68	14–15	Georgia Dome (12,412); Atlanta
*Non-conference game. ^{#}Rankings from AP Poll. (#) Tournament seedings in parentheses.
