= 2001–02 Mississippi State Bulldogs men's basketball team =

American college basketball season

2001–02 Mississippi State Bulldogs men's basketball

SEC tournament champions

NCAA tournament, second round
- Conference: Southeastern Conference

Ranking
- Coaches: No. 21
- AP: No. 17
- Record: 27–8 (10–6 SEC)
- Head coach: Rick Stansbury (4th season)
- Assistant coaches: Phil Cunningham; Robert Kirby; Mark White
- Home arena: Humphrey Coliseum

2001–02 Southeastern Conference men's basketball standings
	Conf.				Overall
Team	W		L	PCT	W		L	PCT
East
No. 15 Florida	10	–	6	.625	22	–	9	.710
No. 16 Kentucky	10	–	6	.625	22	–	10	.688
No. 23 Georgia	10	–	6	.625	22	–	10	.688
Tennessee	7	–	9	.438	15	–	16	.484
South Carolina	6	–	10	.375	22	–	15	.595
Vanderbilt	6	–	10	.375	17	–	15	.531
West
No. 8 Alabama	12	–	4	.750	27	–	8	.771
No. 17 Mississippi State †	10	–	6	.625	27	–	8	.771
Ole Miss	9	–	7	.563	20	–	11	.645
LSU	6	–	10	.375	19	–	15	.559
Arkansas	6	–	10	.375	14	–	15	.483
Auburn	4	–	12	.250	12	–	16	.429
† 2002 SEC tournament winner Rankings from AP Poll

The 2001–02 Mississippi State basketball team represented Mississippi State University as a member of the Southeastern Conference during the 2001–02 college basketball season. Under fourth-year head coach Rick Stansbury, the team played their home games at Humphrey Coliseum in Starkville, Mississippi. Mississippi State finished second in the SEC West Division regular season standings. The Bulldogs won the SEC tournament to receive an automatic bid to the NCAA tournament as No. 3 seed in the Midwest region. The Bulldogs beat No. 14 seed McNeese State in the opening round, 70–58, before being beaten by No. 6 seed Texas, 68–64, in the round of 32. Mississippi State finished the season with a record of 27–8 (10–6 SEC).

== Roster ==
2001–02 Mississippi State Bulldogs men's basketball team
Players
Coaches

Pos.	#	Name	Height	Weight	Year	Previous school	Hometown
G	10	Roy Goffer	6 ft 3 in (1.91 m)	175 lb (79 kg)	So	Kiryat Shirat HS	Ness Ziona, Israel
G	14	Guy Gardner	6 ft 2 in (1.88 m)	170 lb (77 kg)	Sr	Northeast Mississippi CC	Baldwyn, MS
G	15	Timmy Bowers	6 ft 2 in (1.88 m)	190 lb (86 kg)	So	Harrison Central HS	Gulfport, MS
G	20	Corey Stidham	5 ft 11 in (1.8 m)	165 lb (75 kg)	Jr	East Webster HS	Mathiston, MS
F	21	Michael Gholar	6 ft 5 in (1.96 m)	205 lb (93 kg)	Sr	Prentiss HS	Prentiss, MS
G	22	Derrick Zimmerman	6 ft 3 in (1.91 m)	195 lb (88 kg)	Jr	Wossman HS	Monroe, LA
G	23	Winsome Frazier	6 ft 4 in (1.93 m)	180 lb (82 kg)	Fr	Miami Northwestern HS	Miami, FL
F	24	Marckell Patterson	6 ft 5 in (1.96 m)	185 lb (84 kg)	Sr	Eupora HS	Eupora, MS
F	31	Ontario Harper	6 ft 5 in (1.96 m)	215 lb (98 kg)	So	Winchendon (MA) Prep	Clinton, MS
G	32	Brandon Carr	6 ft 1 in (1.85 m)	215 lb (98 kg)	Jr	Porter's Chapel Academy	Vicksburg, MS
F	33	Mario Austin	6 ft 9 in (2.06 m)	260 lb (118 kg)	So	Sumter County HS	York, AL
C	34	Lincoln Smith	6 ft 9 in (2.06 m)	265 lb (120 kg)	So	Simmons HS	Hollandale, MS
F	44	Michal Ignerski	6 ft 10 in (2.08 m)	225 lb (102 kg)	Jr	Eastern Oklahoma State	Lublin, Poland
F	50	Marcus Campbell	7 ft 0 in (2.13 m)	270 lb (122 kg)	Fr	Westover HS	Albany, GA

Head coach

- Rick Stansbury (Campbellsville)

Assistant coach(es)

- Phil Cunningham (Campbellsville)
- Robert Kirby (UTPA)
- Mark White (Austin Peay)

Legend

- (C) Team captain
- (S) Suspended
- (I) Ineligible
- (W) Walk-on
- Injured
- Current redshirt

Roster

== Schedule and results ==
Date time, TV	Rank^{#}	Opponent^{#}	Result	Record	Site city, state
Non-conference Regular season
Nov 17, 2001*		Nicholls State	W 95–59	1–0	Humphrey Coliseum; Starkville, Mississippi
Nov 19, 2001*		Florida A&M	W 92–55	2–0	Humphrey Coliseum; Starkville, Mississippi
Nov 21, 2001*		Arkansas–Little Rock	W 93–81	3–0	Humphrey Coliseum; Starkville, Mississippi
Nov 24, 2001*		at Louisiana–Lafayette	W 79–71	4–0	Cajundome; Lafayette, Louisiana
Nov 28, 2001*		Alabama A&M	W 70–45	5–0	Humphrey Coliseum; Starkville, Mississippi
Dec 2, 2001*		South Alabama	W 73–66	6–0	Humphrey Coliseum; Starkville, Mississippi
Dec 5, 2001*		at Richmond	W 71–57	7–0	Robins Center; Richmond, Virginia
Dec 8, 2001*		Arkansas State	W 91–83	8–0	Humphrey Coliseum; Starkville, Mississippi
Dec 15, 2001*		vs. Louisiana–Monroe	W 104–67	9–0	DeSoto Civic Center; Southaven, Mississippi
Dec 16, 2001*		at Georgia State; Peach Bowl Classic	W 72–63	10–0	GSU Sports Arena; Atlanta, Georgia
Dec 20, 2001*		vs. Richmond; Las Vegas Classic	W 74–72	11–0	Valley High School; Las Vegas, Nevada
Dec 21, 2001*		vs. No. 25 Cincinnati; Las Vegas Classic	L 56–90	11–1	Valley High School; Las Vegas, Nevada
Dec 22, 2001*		vs. UIC; Las Vegas Classic	W 77–74	12–1	Valley High School; Las Vegas, Nevada
Dec 29, 2001*		at Tulane	W 77–66	13–1	Avron B. Fogelman Arena; New Orleans, Louisiana
SEC Regular season
Jan 5, 2002; 1:00 p.m., JP Sports		No. 6 Kentucky	W 74–69 ^{OT}	14–1 (1–0)	Humphrey Coliseum (9,347); Starkville, Mississippi
Jan 8, 2002; 8:00 p.m., ESPN	No. 21	at Arkansas	L 64–75	14–2 (1–1)	Bud Walton Arena (18,037); Fayetteville, Arkansas
Jan 12, 2002	No. 21	at Ole Miss	L 59–66	14–3 (1–2)	Tad Smith Coliseum; Oxford, Mississippi
Jan 16, 2002		Tennessee	W 92–91 ^{OT}	15–3 (2–2)	Humphrey Coliseum; Starkville, Mississippi
Jan 19, 2002		at No. 16 Alabama	L 73–85	15–4 (2–3)	Coleman Coliseum; Tuscaloosa, Alabama
Jan 26, 2002		LSU	W 84–61	16–4 (3–3)	Humphrey Coliseum; Starkville, Mississippi
Jan 30, 2002		at Auburn	W 72–64	17–4 (4–3)	Beard–Eaves–Memorial Coliseum; Auburn, Alabama
Feb 2, 2002		at No. 5 Florida	L 48–76	17–5 (4–4)	O'Connell Center; Gainesville, Florida
Feb 6, 2002		No. 17 Georgia	L 68–86	17–6 (4–5)	Humphrey Coliseum; Starkville, Mississippi
Feb 9, 2002		No. 5 Alabama	W 76–62	18–6 (5–5)	Humphrey Coliseum; Starkville, Mississippi
Feb 13, 2002		at LSU	L 65–68 ^{OT}	18–7 (5–6)	Pete Maravich Assembly Center; Baton Rouge, Louisiana
Feb 16, 2002		Auburn	W 89–53	19–7 (6–6)	Humphrey Coliseum; Starkville, Mississippi
Feb 20, 2002		at Vanderbilt	W 66–43	20–7 (7–6)	Memorial Gymnasium; Nashville, Tennessee
Feb 23, 2002		Ole Miss	W 61–59	21–7 (8–6)	Humphrey Coliseum; Starkville, Mississippi
Feb 27, 2002; 7:00 p.m., JP Sports		Arkansas	W 89–83	22–7 (9–6)	Humphrey Coliseum (6,806); Starkville, Mississippi
Mar 2, 2002		at South Carolina	W 64–57	23–7 (10–6)	Carolina Coliseum; Columbia, South Carolina
SEC Tournament
Mar 8, 2002*	(W2)	vs. (E3) No. 11 Florida; Quarterfinals	W 62–52	24–7	Georgia Dome; Atlanta, Georgia
Mar 9, 2002*	(W2)	vs. (W4) LSU; Semifinals	W 57–51	25–7	Georgia Dome; Atlanta, Georgia
Mar 10, 2002*; CBS	(W2)	vs. (W1) No. 8 Alabama; Championship game	W 61–58	26–7	Georgia Dome; Atlanta, Georgia
NCAA Tournament
Mar 15, 2002*	(3 MW) No. 17	vs. (14 MW) McNeese State; First Round	W 70–58	27–7	American Airlines Center; Dallas, Texas
Mar 17, 2002*	(3 MW) No. 17	vs. (6 MW) Texas; Second Round	L 64–68	27–8	American Airlines Center; Dallas, Texas
*Non-conference game. ^{#}Rankings from AP poll. (#) Tournament seedings in parentheses. MW=Midwst. All times are in Central Time.
