= 2001–02 Ivy League men's basketball season =

The 2001–02 Ivy League men's basketball season was the Ivy League's 48th season of basketball. Penn, Yale and Princeton finished the season tied with identical 11-3 records and shared the league championship. To determine the recipient of the league's automatic bid to the NCAA tournament a three-team, two-game tournament was held at neutral sites. Penn's 3–1 record in games with Princeton and Yale gave them the top seed and a bye. In the first game Yale defeated Princeton 76–60 at the Palestra on Penn's campus. Penn then defeated Yale 77–58 at Lafayette College and received the Ivy League's automatic bid to the 2002 NCAA Men's Division I Basketball Tournament. Ugonna Onyekwe of Penn was named the Ivy League Men's Basketball Player of the Year.

== Standings ==
School	Coach	W	L
Penn	Fran Dunphy	11	3
Yale	James Jones	11	3
Princeton	John Thompson III	11	3
Brown	Glen Miller	8	6
Harvard	Frank Sullivan	7	7
Columbia	Armond Hill	4	10
Dartmouth	Dave Faucher	2	12
Cornell	Steve Donahue	2	12

== Statistical leaders ==
Category	Player	Team	Stat
Points per game	Earl Hunt	Brown	19.7
Rebounds per game	Koko Archibong	Penn	10.0
Assists per game	Elliott Prasse-Freeman	Harvard	5.3
Steals per game	Andrew Gellert	Harvard	2.42
Blocks per game	Chris Wiedemann	Columbia	2.54
FT%	Earl Hunt	Brown	84.1
3FG%	Flinder Boyd	Dartmouth	48.5
