= 2002 Southland Conference men's basketball tournament =

American basketball tournament

- Classification: Division I
- Season: 2001–02
- Teams: 6
- First round site: Campus sites
- Semifinals site: Campus sites
- Finals site: Burton Coliseum; Lake Charles, Louisiana
- Champions: McNeese State (2nd title)
- Winning coach: Tic Price (1st title)
- MVP: Fred Gentry (McNeese State)

2001–02 Southland Conference men's basketball standings
	Conf.				Overall
Team	W		L	PCT	W		L	PCT
McNeese State †	17	–	3	.850	21	–	9	.700
Louisiana–Monroe	15	–	5	.750	20	–	12	.625
UTSA	13	–	7	.650	19	–	10	.655
Lamar	11	–	9	.550	15	–	14	.517
Stephen F. Austin	10	–	10	.500	13	–	15	.464
Southwest Texas State	10	–	10	.500	12	–	16	.429
Sam Houston State	9	–	11	.450	14	–	14	.500
Texas–Arlington	9	–	11	.450	12	–	15	.444
Northwestern State	9	–	11	.450	13	–	18	.419
Southeastern Louisiana	6	–	14	.300	7	–	20	.259
Nicholls State	1	–	19	.050	2	–	25	.074
† 2002 Southland Conference tournament winner Rankings from AP Poll

The 2002 Southland Conference men's basketball tournament took place March 4–9, 2002. The quarterfinal and semifinal rounds were played at the home arena of the higher seeded-teams, with the championship game played at Burton Coliseum in Lake Charles, Louisiana.

Top-seeded McNeese State won the championship game over second-seeded Louisiana–Monroe, and earned the conference's automatic bid to the NCAA tournament. Fred Gentry of McNeese State was named the tournament's MVP.

== Format ==
The top six eligible men's basketball teams in the Southland Conference received a berth in the conference tournament. After the conference season, teams were seeded by conference record. For the semifinal round, the remaining teams were reseeded.

== Bracket ==
Quarterfinals; March 4
4	Lamar	53
5	Stephen F. Austin	36
3	UTSA	99
6	Southwest Texas State	83

Semifinals; March 6
1	McNeese State	71
4	Lamar	57
2	Louisiana–Monroe	64
3	UTSA	62

Finals; March 9
1	McNeese State	65
2	Louisiana–Monroe	43
