= 2001–02 Western Kentucky Hilltoppers basketball team =

American college basketball season

2001–02 Western Kentucky Hilltoppers basketball

Sun Belt Conference tournament Champion Sun Belt Conference East Division Champion NABC Classic Champion

NCAA Tournament, first round
- Conference: Sun Belt Conference
- East Division

Ranking
- AP: No. 19
- Record: 28–4 (13–1 Sun Belt)
- Head coach: Dennis Felton
- Assistant coach: Pete Herrmann
- Home arena: E. A. Diddle Arena

2001–02 Sun Belt Conference men's basketball standings
	Conf.				Overall
Team	W		L	PCT	W		L	PCT
East
No. 19 Western Kentucky †	13	–	1	.929	28	–	4	.875
Arkansas-Little Rock	8	–	6	.571	18	–	11	.621
Middle Tennessee	6	–	8	.429	14	–	15	.483
Arkansas State	5	–	9	.357	15	–	16	.484
Florida International	4	–	10	.286	10	–	20	.333
West
Louisiana–Lafayette	11	–	4	.733	20	–	11	.645
New Mexico State	11	–	4	.733	20	–	12	.625
New Orleans	9	–	6	.600	15	–	14	.517
North Texas	8	–	7	.533	15	–	14	.517
Denver	3	–	12	.200	8	–	20	.286
South Alabama	2	–	13	.133	7	–	21	.250
† 2002 Sun Belt Conference tournament winner Rankings from AP poll

The 2001–02 Western Kentucky Hilltoppers men's basketball team represented Western Kentucky University during the 2001–02 NCAA Division I men's basketball season. The Hilltoppers were led by Sun Belt Conference Coach of the Year Dennis Felton and All-American Center Chris Marcus. The team won the East Division Championship and the Sun Belt Basketball tournament, earning an automatic bid to the 2002 NCAA Division I men's basketball tournament. One of the highlights of the season was a victory over in-state rival, 4th ranked Kentucky. Marcus missed 17 games this season due to an ankle injury. David Boyden and Derek Robinson were named to the All SBC team. Marcus and Patrick Sparks made the SBC All-Tournament team and Robinson was the tournament MVP.

== Schedule ==
Date time, TV	Rank^{#}	Opponent^{#}	Result	Record	Site city, state
Regular season
11/15/2001*		at No. 4 Kentucky; NABC Classic	W 64–52	1–0	Rupp Arena (21,104); Lexington, KY
11/16/2001*		vs. George Washington; NABC Classic	W 73–48	2–0	Rupp Arena (16,193); Lexington, KY
11/20/2001*	No. 21	Evansville	W 90–64	3–0	E. A. Diddle Arena (7,322); Bowling Green, KY
11/24/2001*	No. 21	Murray State	W 101–77	4–0	E. A. Diddle Arena (8,117); Bowling Green, KY
11/27/2001*	No. 17	at Creighton	L 91–94 ^{2OT}	4–1	Omaha Civic Auditorium (7,287); Omaha, NE
12/2/2001*	No. 17	at Vanderbilt; Marcus out with injury	L 75–80	4–2	Memorial Gymnasium (12,271); Nashville, TN
12/3/2001*	No. 25	at Akron	W 78–68	5–2	James A. Rhodes Arena (2,524); Akron, OH
12/8/2001*	No. 25	at Austin Peay	W 77–75	6–2	Dunn Center (2,517); Clarksville, TN
12/15/2001*		West Alabama	W 103–40	7–2	E. A. Diddle Arena (4,658); Bowling Green, KY
12/19/2001*		Creighton	W 95–61	8–2	E. A. Diddle Arena (6,267); Bowling Green, KY
12/22/2001*		at Southern Mississippi	W 74–50	9–2	Reed Green Coliseum (2,855); Hattiesburg, MS
12/28/2001*		at New Orleans	W 90–76	10–2 (1–0)	Lakefront Arena (2,270); New Orleans, LA
12/30/2001		at South Alabama	L 58–61	10–3 (1–1)	Mitchell Center (1,479); Mobile, AL
1/2/2002		at FIU	W 65–54	11–3 (2–1)	Ocean Bank Convocation Center (306); University Park, FL
1/5/2002*		Austin Peay	W 75–73	12–3	E. A. Diddle Arena (6,764); Bowling Green, KY
1/10/2002		Louisiana–Lafayette	W 63–62	13–3 (3–1)	E. A. Diddle Arena (4,757); Bowling Green, KY
1/13/2002		New Mexico State	W 83–67	14–3 (4–1)	E. A. Diddle Arena (8,178); Bowling Green, KY
1/16/2002		at Middle Tennessee	W 55–45	15–3 (5–1)	Murphy Center (4,116); Murfreesboro, TN
1/19/2002		at Denver	W 86–59	16–3 (6–1)	Magness Arena (1,741); Denver, CO
1/24/2002		Arkansas–Little Rock	W 95–85	17–3 (7–1)	E. A. Diddle Arena (6,239); Bowling Green, KY
1/27/2002		Arkansas State	W 45–42	18–3 (8–1)	E. A. Diddle Arena (5,465); Bowling Green, KY
1/31/2002		FIU	W 66–64	19–3 (9–1)	E. A. Diddle Arena (6,410); Bowling Green, KY
2/3/2002*		Morris Brown; Marcus returns	W 92–53	20–3	E. A. Diddle Arena (4,319); Bowling Green, KY
2/7/2002		at Arkansas–Little Rock	W 83–79 ^{OT}	21–3 (10–1)	Alltel Arena (6,012); North Little Rock, AR
2/9/2002		at Arkansas State	W 50–46	22–3 (11–1)	Convocation Center (6,437); Jonesboro, AR
2/16/2002		North Texas	W 100–76	23–3 (12–1)	E. A. Diddle Arena (8,192); Bowling Green, KY
2/19/2002*	No. 24	Kentucky State	W 100–63	24–3	E. A. Diddle Arena (5,051); Bowling Green, KY
2/23/2002	No. 24	Middle Tennessee	W 65–61	25–3 (13–1)	E. A. Diddle Arena (8,325); Bowling Green, KY
2002 Sun Belt Conference men's basketball tournament
3/2/2002	(1E) No. 20	vs. (4W) North Texas; Second Round	W 82–68	26–3	Lakefront Arena (4,943); New Orleans, LA
3/4/2002	(1E) No. 18	vs. (2W) New Mexico State; Semifinals	W 73–72	27–3	Lakefront Arena (4,052); New Orleans, LA
3/5/2002	(1E) No. 18	vs. (1W) Louisiana–Lafayette; Championship	W 76–70	28–3	Lakefront Arena (4,203); New Orleans, LA
2002 NCAA Division I men's basketball tournament
3/14/2002*	(9 MW) No. 19	vs. (8 MW) No. 24 Stanford; First Round	L 68–84	28–4	Edward Jones Dome (26,612); St. Louis, MO
*Non-conference game. ^{#}Rankings from AP Poll (M#) during NCAA Tournament is seed with Region. (#) Tournament seedings in parentheses.
