= 2001–02 Alabama Crimson Tide men's basketball team =

American college basketball season

2001–02 Alabama Crimson Tide men's basketball

SEC regular season champions

NCAA tournament, second round
- Conference: Southeastern Conference
- Western Division

Ranking
- Coaches: No. 14
- AP: No. 8
- Record: 27–8 (12–4 SEC)
- Head coach: Mark Gottfried (4th season)
- Assistant coaches: Philip Pearson; Orlando Early; T. R. Dunn
- Home arena: Coleman Coliseum (Capacity: 15,316)

2001–02 Southeastern Conference men's basketball standings
	Conf.				Overall
Team	W		L	PCT	W		L	PCT
East
No. 15 Florida	10	–	6	.625	22	–	9	.710
No. 16 Kentucky	10	–	6	.625	22	–	10	.688
No. 23 Georgia	10	–	6	.625	22	–	10	.688
Tennessee	7	–	9	.438	15	–	16	.484
South Carolina	6	–	10	.375	22	–	15	.595
Vanderbilt	6	–	10	.375	17	–	15	.531
West
No. 8 Alabama	12	–	4	.750	27	–	8	.771
No. 17 Mississippi State †	10	–	6	.625	27	–	8	.771
Ole Miss	9	–	7	.563	20	–	11	.645
LSU	6	–	10	.375	19	–	15	.559
Arkansas	6	–	10	.375	14	–	15	.483
Auburn	4	–	12	.250	12	–	16	.429
† 2002 SEC tournament winner Rankings from AP Poll

The 2001–02 Alabama Crimson Tide men's basketball team (variously "Alabama", "UA", "Bama" or "The Tide") represented the University of Alabama in the 2001–02 college basketball season. The head coach was Mark Gottfried, who was in his fourth season at Alabama. The team played its home games at Coleman Coliseum in Tuscaloosa, Alabama and was a member of the Southeastern Conference. This was the 90th season of basketball in the school's history. The Crimson Tide finished the season 27–8, 12–4 in SEC play, they lost in the championship game of the 2002 SEC men's basketball tournament after winning the regular season championship for the first time since 1986-87. They were invited to the NCAA tournament but, lost in the second round.

== Roster ==
#	Name	Class	Position	Height	Weight	Home Town
3	Solomon Davis	Senior	Forward	6–6	225	Mobile, AL
4	Reggie Rambo	Sophomore	Forward	6–7	225	Lena, LA
5	Earnest Shelton	Freshman	Guard	6–3	215	Memphis, TN
14	Terrance Meade	Junior	Guard	6–2	190	Scottsboro, AL
21	Rod Grizzard	Junior	Guard	6–8	205	Birmingham, AL
22	Travis Stinnett	Junior	Guard	6–0	170	Maryville, TN
23	Demetrius Smith	Sophomore	Guard	6–3	210	Hogansville, GA
25	Mo Williams	Freshman	Guard	6–1	185	Jackson, MS
35	Erwin Dudley	Junior	Forward	6–8	240	Uniontown, AL
42	Kenny Walker	Junior	Forward	6–9	220	Jacksonville, FL
50	Antoine Pettway	Sophomore	Guard	6–0	170	Camden, AL

== Schedule and results ==
Date time, TV	Rank^{#}	Opponent^{#}	Result	Record	Site (attendance) city, state
Exhibition
November 1, 2001*		Athletes in Action	W 103–77		Coleman Coliseum; Tuscaloosa, AL
November 8, 2001*		EA Sports	W 92–71		Coleman Coliseum; Tuscaloosa, AL
Non-conference regular season
November 13, 2001*	No. 24	Mississippi Valley State; Guardians Classic campus game	W 107–67	1–0	Coleman Coliseum; Tuscaloosa, AL
November 14, 2001*	No. 24	Samford; Guardians Classic campus game	W 83–51	2–0	Coleman Coliseum; Tuscaloosa, AL
November 20, 2001*	No. 22	vs. No. 5 Missouri; Guardians Classic semifinals	L 68–75	2–1	Kemper Arena; Kansas City, MO
November 21, 2001*; 6:00 p.m.	No. 22	vs. No. 12 Memphis; Guardians Classic consolation game	W 81–70	3–1	Kemper Arena; Kansas City, MO
November 26, 2001*	No. 22	Utah	W 76–61	4–1	Coleman Coliseum; Tuscaloosa, AL
November 29, 2001*	No. 21	McNeese State	W 90–61	5–1	Coleman Coliseum; Tuscaloosa, AL
December 3, 2001*	No. 21	Chattanooga	W 74–68	6–1	Coleman Coliseum; Tuscaloosa, AL
December 8, 2001*	No. 16	vs. No. 20 UCLA; John R. Wooden Classic	L 57–79	6–2	Arrowhead Pond of Anaheim; Anaheim, CA
December 14, 2001*	No. 22	Jacksonville State	W 99–57	7–2	Coleman Coliseum; Tuscaloosa, AL
December 18, 2001*	No. 23	vs. Temple; Jimmy V Classic	W 70–67	8–2	Meadowlands Arena; East Rutherford, NJ
December 21, 2001*	No. 23	Alabama A&M	W 90–54	9–2	Coleman Coliseum; Tuscaloosa, AL
December 27, 2001*	No. 21	vs. Notre Dame; Sugar Bowl Classic	W 79–76	10–2	New Orleans Arena; New Orleans, LA
December 31, 2001*	No. 21	Florida A&M	W 76–52	11–2	Coleman Coliseum; Tuscaloosa, AL
January 2, 2002*	No. 18	Bethune–Cookman	W 93–46	12–2	Coleman Coliseum; Tuscaloosa, AL
SEC regular season
January 5, 2002	No. 18	LSU	W 76–74	13–2 (1–0)	Coleman Coliseum; Tuscaloosa, AL
January 9, 2002	No. 14	Vanderbilt	W 92–79	14–2 (2–0)	Coleman Coliseum; Tuscaloosa, AL
January 12, 2002	No. 14	at Auburn; Iron Bowl of basketball	L 56–59	14–3 (2–1)	Beard-Eaves-Memorial Coliseum; Auburn, AL
January 16, 2002	No. 16	at No. 20 Georgia	W 77–72	15–3 (3–1)	Stegeman Coliseum; Athens, GA
January 19, 2002	No. 16	Mississippi State	W 85–73	16–3 (4–1)	Coleman Coliseum; Tuscaloosa, AL
January 26, 2002	No. 14	at No. 8 Kentucky	W 64–61	17–3 (5–1)	Rupp Arena; Lexington, KY
January 30, 2002	No. 7	Arkansas	W 109–94	18–3 (6–1)	Coleman Coliseum; Tuscaloosa, AL
February 2, 2002	No. 7	at LSU	W 57–48	19–3 (7–1)	Pete Maravich Assembly Center; Baton Rouge, LA
February 6, 2002	No. 5	Ole Miss	W 79–59	20–3 (8–1)	Coleman Coliseum; Tuscaloosa, AL
February 9, 2002	No. 5	at Mississippi State	L 62–76	20–4 (8–2)	Humphrey Coliseum; Starkville, MS
February 13, 2002	No. 7	at South Carolina	W 52–51	21–4 (9–2)	Frank McGuire Arena; Columbia, SC
February 16, 2002	No. 7	Tennessee	W 95–82	22–4 (10–2)	Coleman Coliseum; Tuscaloosa, AL
February 20, 2002	No. 5	at Arkansas	L 59–67	22–5 (10–3)	Bud Walton Arena; Fayetteville, Arkansas
February 23, 2002	No. 5	No. 8 Florida	W 65–64	23–5 (11–3)	Coleman Coliseum; Tuscaloosa, AL
February 27, 2002	No. 6	Auburn; Iron Bowl of Basketball	W 73–68	24–5 (12–3)	Coleman Coliseum; Tuscaloosa, AL
March 3, 2002	No. 6	at Ole Miss	L 56–84	24–6 (12–4)	Tad Smith Coliseum; Oxford, MS
SEC tournament
March 7, 2002	(W1) No. 8	vs. (E4) Tennessee; Second Round	W 91–72	25–6	Georgia Dome; Atlanta, GA
March 9, 2002	(W1) No. 8	vs. (E6) South Carolina; Semifinals	W 67–55	26–6	Georgia Dome; Atlanta, GA
March 10, 2002; CBS	(W1) No. 8	vs. (W2) Mississippi State; Championship Game	L 58–61	26–7	Georgia Dome; Atlanta, GA
NCAA tournament
March 14, 2002*; CBS	(2) No. 8	vs. (15) Florida Atlantic; First round	W 86–78	27–7	BI-LO Center; Greenville, SC
March 16, 2002*; CBS	(2) No. 8	vs. (10) Kent State; Second round	L 58–71	27–8	BI-LO Center; Greenville, SC
*Non-conference game. ^{#}Rankings from AP Poll. (#) Tournament seedings in parentheses. All times are in Central Time.

== See also ==
- 2002 NCAA Division I men's basketball tournament
- 2001–02 NCAA Division I men's basketball season
- 2001–02 NCAA Division I men's basketball rankings
