= 2001–02 Murray State Racers men's basketball team =

American college basketball season

2001–02 Murray State Racers men's basketball

Ohio Valley tournament champions

NCAA tournament, first round
- Conference: Ohio Valley Conference
- Record: 19–13 (10–6 OVC)
- Head coach: Tevester Anderson (4th season)
- Assistant coach: Anthony Boone (2nd season)
- Home arena: Regional Special Events Center

2001–02 Ohio Valley Conference men's basketball standings
	Conf.				Overall
Team	W		L	PCT	W		L	PCT
Tennessee Tech	15	–	1	.938	27	–	7	.794
Morehead State	11	–	5	.688	18	–	11	.621
Murray State †	10	–	6	.625	19	–	13	.594
Austin Peay	8	–	8	.500	14	–	18	.438
UT Martin	7	–	9	.438	15	–	14	.517
Eastern Illinois	7	–	9	.438	15	–	16	.484
Tennessee State	7	–	9	.438	11	–	17	.393
Southeast Missouri State	4	–	12	.250	6	–	22	.214
Eastern Kentucky	3	–	13	.188	7	–	20	.259
† 2002 OVC tournament winner Rankings from AP Poll

The 2001–02 Murray State Racers men's basketball team represented Murray State University during the 2001–02 NCAA Division I men's basketball season. The Racers, led by fourth-year head coach Tevester Anderson, played their home games at the Regional Special Events Center in Murray, Kentucky, as members of the Ohio Valley Conference. They finished the season 19–13, 10–6 in OVC play to end the regular season in third place. They defeated Tennessee Tech to win the OVC tournament to advance to the NCAA tournament. As No. 14 seed in the East region, the Racers were beaten by No. 3 seed Georgia, 85–68, in the opening round.

== Roster ==
2001–02 Murray State Racers men's basketball team
Players	Coaches
Pos. / # / Name / Height / Weight / Year / Hometown; F / 42 / James Singleton / 6 ft 8 in (2.03 m) / 215 lb (98 kg) / Jr / Chicago, Illinois	Head coach: Tevester Anderson; Assistant coach(es): Anthony Boone (Mississippi); Legend: (C) Team captain; (S) Suspended; (I) Ineligible; (W) Walk-on; Injured; Current redshirt

== Schedule and results ==
Date time, TV	Rank^{#}	Opponent^{#}	Result	Record	Site (attendance) city, state
Regular season
Nov 17, 2001*		West Florida	W 100–61	1–0	Regional Special Events Center (2,341); Murray, Kentucky
Nov 19, 2001*		Colorado Springs	W 109–44	2–0	Regional Special Events Center (1,648); Murray, Kentucky
Nov 24, 2001*		at No. 21 Western Kentucky	L 77–101	2–1	E. A. Diddle Arena (8,117); Bowling Green, Kentucky
Nov 29, 2001*		Chattanooga	W 72–63	3–1	Regional Special Events Center; Murray, Kentucky
Dec 1, 2001*		UAB	W 74–69	4–1	Regional Special Events Center; Murray, Kentucky
Dec 3, 2001*		at Indiana State	L 66–74	4–2	Hulman Center; Terre Haute, Indiana
Dec 7, 2001*		vs. Virginia Tech; Jim Thorpe Classic	W 66–63	5–2	Freedom Hall; Louisville, Kentucky
Dec 8, 2001*		at Louisville; Jim Thorpe Classic	L 69–84	5–3	Freedom Hall; Louisville, Kentucky
Dec 11, 2001*		at DePaul	W 69–65	6–3	Allstate Arena; Rosemont, Illinois
Dec 20, 2001		Tennessee State	W 103–72	7–3 (1–0)	Regional Special Events Center; Murray, Kentucky
Dec 22, 2001*		at Chattanooga	L 58–71	7–4	McKenzie Arena; Chattanooga, Tennessee
Dec 29, 2001*		Southern Illinois	L 63–67	7–5	Regional Special Events Center; Murray, Kentucky
Jan 3, 2002		Tennessee–Martin	W 90–76	8–5 (2–0)	Regional Special Events Center; Murray, Kentucky
Jan 5, 2002*		Gardner–Webb	L 66–80	8–6	Regional Special Events Center; Murray, Kentucky
Jan 10, 2002		at Tennessee Tech	L 59–78	8–7 (2–1)	Hooper Eblen Center; Cookeville, Tennessee
Jan 12, 2002		at Austin Peay	L 62–68	8–8 (2–2)	Winfield Dunn Center; Clarksville, Tennessee
Jan 17, 2002		Eastern Illinois	L 86–88	8–9 (2–3)	Regional Special Events Center; Murray, Kentucky
Jan 19, 2002		Southeast Missouri State	W 85–72	9–9 (3–3)	Regional Special Events Center; Murray, Kentucky
Jan 24, 2002		Morehead State	L 83–92 ^{OT}	9–10 (3–4)	Regional Special Events Center; Murray, Kentucky
Jan 26, 2002		at Eastern Kentucky	L 81–92	9–11 (3–5)	Alumni Coliseum; Richmond, Kentucky
Feb 2, 2002		at Tennessee–Martin	W 92–74	10–11 (4–5)	Skyhawk Arena; Martin, Tennessee
Feb 4, 2002		at Tennessee State	W 87–84	11–11 (5–5)	Gentry Complex; Nashville, Tennessee
Feb 7, 2002		Tennessee Tech	W 75–56	12–11 (6–5)	Regional Special Events Center; Murray, Kentucky
Feb 9, 2002		Austin Peay	W 76–68	13–11 (7–5)	Regional Special Events Center; Murray, Kentucky
Feb 14, 2002		at Eastern Illinois	W 75–56	14–11 (8–5)	Lantz Arena; Charleston, Illinois
Feb 16, 2002		at Southeast Missouri State	W 75–56	15–11 (9–5)	Show Me Center; Cape Girardeau, Missouri
Feb 21, 2002		Eastern Kentucky	W 75–56	16–11 (10–5)	Regional Special Events Center; Murray, Kentucky
Feb 23, 2002		Morehead State	L 60–66	16–12 (10–6)	Regional Special Events Center; Murray, Kentucky
Ohio Valley Conference tournament
Feb 26, 2002*		Eastern Illinois; Quarterfinals	W 103–56	17–12	Regional Special Events Center; Murray, Kentucky
Mar 1, 2002*		vs. Morehead State; Semifinals	W 89–75	18–12	Kentucky International Convention Center; Louisville, Kentucky
Mar 2, 2002*		vs. Tennessee Tech; Championship game	W 70–69	19–12	Kentucky International Convention Center; Louisville, Kentucky
NCAA tournament
Mar 15, 2002*	(14 MW)	vs. (3 MW) No. 23 Georgia; First round	L 68–85	19–13	United Center; Chicago, Illinois
*Non-conference game. ^{#}Rankings from AP Poll. (#) Tournament seedings in parentheses. E=East. All times are in Central Time.
