= 2007 SWAC men's basketball tournament =

Basketball Tournament March 2007 in Alabama

- Classification: Division I
- Season: 2006–07
- Teams: 8
- Site: Bill Harris Arena; Birmingham, Alabama
- Champions: Jackson State (5th title)
- Winning coach: Tevester Anderson (1st title)

2006–07 SWAC men's basketball standings
	Conf.				Overall
Team	W		L	PCT	W		L	PCT
Mississippi Valley State	13	–	5	.722	18	–	16	.529
Jackson State †	12	–	6	.667	21	–	14	.600
Grambling State	10	–	8	.556	12	–	14	.462
Alcorn State	10	–	8	.556	11	–	19	.367
Texas Southern	9	–	9	.500	14	–	17	.452
Arkansas–Pine Bluff	9	–	9	.500	12	–	19	.387
Southern	9	–	9	.500	10	–	21	.323
Alabama State	8	–	10	.444	10	–	20	.333
Prairie View A&M	6	–	12	.333	8	–	22	.267
Alabama A&M	4	–	14	.222	10	–	20	.333
† 2007 SWAC tournament winner Rankings from AP Poll

The 2007 SWAC men's basketball tournament was held March 7–10, 2007, at Bill Harris Arena in Birmingham, Alabama. Jackson State defeated Mississippi Valley State, 81–71 in the championship game. The Tigers received the conference's automatic bid to the 2007 NCAA tournament as No. 16 seed in the Midwest Region.

== Bracket and results ==
Quarterfinals; March 7–8
1	Mississippi Valley State	62
8	Alabama State	52
4	Alcorn State	64
5	Texas Southern	74
3	Grambling State	48
6	Arkansas–Pine Bluff	51
2	Jackson State	74
7	Southern	65

Semifinals; March 9
1	Mississippi Valley State	54
5	Texas Southern	50
6	Arkansas–Pine Bluff	62
2	Jackson State	64

Final; March 10
1	Mississippi Valley State	71
2	Jackson State	81
