= 2001–02 Georgia Bulldogs basketball team =

American college basketball season

2001–02 Georgia Bulldogs basketball

SEC East Division co-champions

NCAA tournament, Second round
- Conference: Southeastern Conference
- East

Ranking
- AP: No. 23
- Record: 22–10, 1 win vacated (10–6 SEC)
- Head coach: Jim Harrick (3rd season)
- Home arena: Stegeman Coliseum

2001–02 Southeastern Conference men's basketball standings
	Conf.				Overall
Team	W		L	PCT	W		L	PCT
East
No. 15 Florida	10	–	6	.625	22	–	9	.710
No. 16 Kentucky	10	–	6	.625	22	–	10	.688
No. 23 Georgia	10	–	6	.625	22	–	10	.688
Tennessee	7	–	9	.438	15	–	16	.484
South Carolina	6	–	10	.375	22	–	15	.595
Vanderbilt	6	–	10	.375	17	–	15	.531
West
No. 8 Alabama	12	–	4	.750	27	–	8	.771
No. 17 Mississippi State †	10	–	6	.625	27	–	8	.771
Ole Miss	9	–	7	.563	20	–	11	.645
LSU	6	–	10	.375	19	–	15	.559
Arkansas	6	–	10	.375	14	–	15	.483
Auburn	4	–	12	.250	12	–	16	.429
† 2002 SEC tournament winner Rankings from AP Poll

The 2001–02 Georgia Bulldogs basketball team represented the University of Georgia as a member of the Southeastern Conference during the 2001–02 NCAA men's basketball season. The team was led by head coach Jim Harrick, and played their home games at Stegeman Coliseum in Athens, Georgia. The Bulldogs finished atop the SEC East standings during the regular season, were bounced early from the SEC tournament, and received an at-large bid to the NCAA tournament as No. 3 seed in the East region. Georgia reached the second round by defeating No. 14 seed Murray State, 85–68, but were upset by No. 11 seed Southern Illinois, 77–75, and finished the season at 22–10 (10–6 SEC).

== Roster ==
2001–02 Georgia Bulldogs men's basketball team
Players
Coaches

Pos.	#	Name	Height	Weight	Year	Hometown
G	5	Ezra Williams	6 ft 4 in (1.93 m)	230 lb (104 kg)	Jr	Marietta, Georgia
F	24	Jarvis Hayes	6 ft 7 in (2.01 m)	220 lb (100 kg)	So	Atlanta, Georgia
F	33	Jonas Hayes	6 ft 8 in (2.03 m)	240 lb (109 kg)	So	Atlanta, Georgia

Head coach

- Jim Harrick

Assistant coach(es)

Legend

- (C) Team captain
- (S) Suspended
- (I) Ineligible
- (W) Walk-on
- Injured
- Current redshirt

== Schedule and results ==
Date time, TV	Rank^{#}	Opponent^{#}	Result	Record	Site city, state
Regular season
Nov 16, 2001*		Furman	W 75–62	1–0	Stegeman Coliseum; Athens, Georgia
Nov 19, 2001*		vs. No. 16 Georgetown; Hall of Fame Tip Off Classic	W 73–59	2–0	Springfield Civic Center (7,246); Springfield, Massachusetts
Nov 21, 2001*		Georgia Southern	W 94–73	3–0	Stegeman Coliseum; Athens, Georgia
Nov 26, 2001*		Samford	W 61–55	4–0	Stegeman Coliseum; Athens, Georgia
Dec 1, 2001*		Colorado	W 81–73	5–0	Stegeman Coliseum; Athens, Georgia
Dec 4, 2001*		at Georgia State	L 78–83	5–1	GSU Sports Arena; Atlanta, Georgia
Dec 7, 2001*		Minnesota	W 77–55	6–1	Stegeman Coliseum; Athens, Georgia
Dec 9, 2001*		Georgia Tech	W 95–82	7–1	Stegeman Coliseum; Athens, Georgia
Dec 15, 2001*		at South Alabama	W 79–70	8–1	Mitchell Center; Mobile, Alabama
Dec 17, 2001*		at Pepperdine	W 91–74	9–1	Firestone Fieldhouse; Malibu, California
Dec 20, 2001*		vs. Arkansas State	W 80–68	10–1	Stan Sheriff Center; Honolulu, Hawaii
Dec 21, 2001*		vs. Miami (OH)	W 64–59	11–1	Stan Sheriff Center; Honolulu, Hawaii
Dec 22, 2001*		at Hawaii	L 44–54	11–2	Stan Sheriff Center; Honolulu, Hawaii
Jan 5, 2002		Vanderbilt	W 83–69	12–2 (1–0)	Stegeman Coliseum; Athens, Georgia
Jan 9, 2002		at No. 8 Kentucky	W 88–84	13–2 (2–0)	Rupp Arena; Lexington, Kentucky
Jan 12, 2002		Tennessee	W 73–70	14–2 (3–0)	Stegeman Coliseum; Athens, Georgia
Jan 16, 2002	No. 20	No. 16 Alabama	L 72–77	14–3 (3–1)	Stegeman Coliseum; Athens, Georgia
Jan 19, 2002	No. 20	at No. 2 Florida	W 84–79	15–3 (4–1)	Stephen C. O'Connell Center; Gainesville, Florida
Jan 23, 2002		Arkansas	W 81–67	16–3 (5–1)	Stegeman Coliseum; Athens, Georgia
Jan 26, 2002		at Vanderbilt	L 84–86	16–4 (5–2)	Memorial Gymnasium; Nashville, Tennessee
Jan 30, 2002		at South Carolina	L 67–80	16–5 (5–3)	Carolina Coliseum; Columbia, South Carolina
Feb 2, 2002		Ole Miss	W 79–72	17–5 (6–3)	Stegeman Coliseum; Athens, Georgia
Feb 6, 2002		at Mississippi State	W 86–68	18–5 (7–3)	Humphrey Coliseum; Starkville, Mississippi
Feb 9, 2002		at Auburn	L 72–75	18–6 (7–4)	Beard-Eaves-Memorial Coliseum; Auburn, Alabama
Feb 12, 2002		No. 6 Florida	L 70–85	18–7 (7–5)	Stegeman Coliseum; Athens, Georgia
Feb 16, 2002		No. 10 Kentucky	W 78–69	19–7 (8–5)	Stegeman Coliseum; Athens, Georgia
Feb 23, 2002		at LSU	W 55–54	20–7 (9–5)	Maravich Assembly Center; Baton Rouge, Louisiana
Feb 27, 2002	No. 16	South Carolina	W 82–75 ^{OT}	21–7 (10–5)	Stegeman Coliseum; Athens, Georgia
Mar 2, 2002	No. 16	at Tennessee	L 63–71 ^{OT}	21–8 (10–6)	Thompson-Boling Arena; Knoxville, Tennessee
SEC Tournament
Mar 8, 2002*	No. 17	vs. LSU; Quarterfinals	L 76–78	21–9	Georgia Dome; Atlanta, Georgia
NCAA Tournament
Mar 15, 2002*	(3 E) No. 23	vs. (14 E) Murray State; First round	W 85–68 (vacated)	22–9	United Center; Chicago, Illinois
Mar 17, 2002*	(3 E) No. 23	vs. (11 E) Southern Illinois; Second round	L 75–77	22–10	United Center; Chicago, Illinois
*Non-conference game. ^{#}Rankings from AP poll. (#) Tournament seedings in parentheses. E=East. All times are in Eastern Time.
