= 2001–02 Kentucky Wildcats men's basketball team =

2001–02 season of University of Kentucky men's basketball team

2001–02 Kentucky Wildcats men's basketball
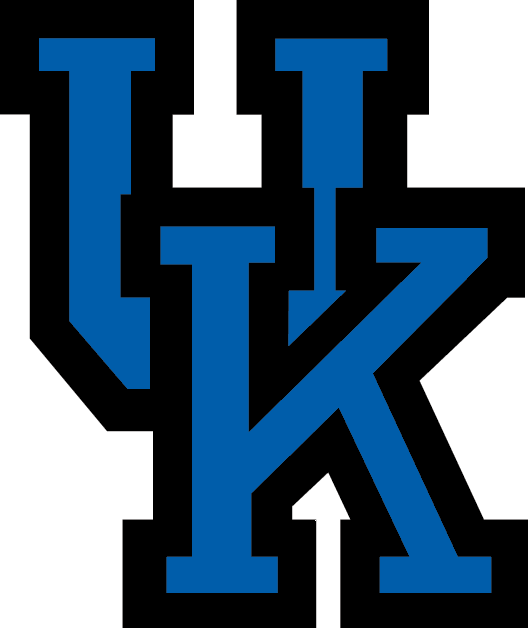

SEC East co-champions

NCAA tournament, Sweet Sixteen
- Conference: Southeastern Conference

Ranking
- Coaches: No. 13
- AP: No. 16
- Record: 22–10 (10–6 SEC)
- Head coach: Tubby Smith (5th season)
- Home arena: Rupp Arena

2001–02 Southeastern Conference men's basketball standings
	Conf.				Overall
Team	W		L	PCT	W		L	PCT
East
No. 15 Florida	10	–	6	.625	22	–	9	.710
No. 16 Kentucky	10	–	6	.625	22	–	10	.688
No. 23 Georgia	10	–	6	.625	22	–	10	.688
Tennessee	7	–	9	.438	15	–	16	.484
South Carolina	6	–	10	.375	22	–	15	.595
Vanderbilt	6	–	10	.375	17	–	15	.531
West
No. 8 Alabama	12	–	4	.750	27	–	8	.771
No. 17 Mississippi State †	10	–	6	.625	27	–	8	.771
Ole Miss	9	–	7	.563	20	–	11	.645
LSU	6	–	10	.375	19	–	15	.559
Arkansas	6	–	10	.375	14	–	15	.483
Auburn	4	–	12	.250	12	–	16	.429
† 2002 SEC tournament winner Rankings from AP Poll

The 2001–02 Kentucky Wildcats men's basketball team represented University of Kentucky in the 2001–02 NCAA Division I men's basketball season. The head coach was Tubby Smith and the team finished the season with an overall record of 22–10.

== Previous season ==
The Wildcats finished the 2000–01 season 24–10, 12–4 in SEC play to finish first in the SEC East. In the SEC tournament, the Wildcats defeated South Carolina Gamecocks men's basketball in the quarterfinals, Arkansas in the semifinals, and Ole Miss in the SEC Championship Game. As a result, the Wildcats received the conference's automatic bid to the NCAA tournament. As the No. 2 seed in the East region, they defeated No. 15 Holy Cross and No. 7 Iowa to advance to the Sweet Sixteen. There, they lost to No. 6-seeded USC.

== Departures ==
Name	Number	Pos.	Height	Weight	Year	Hometown	Reason left
Saul Smith	11	Guard	6'2"	175	Senior	Athens, GA	Graduated
Todd Tackett	12	Guard	6'2"	176	Junior	Paintsville, KY	Left team

== Roster ==
2001–02 Kentucky Wildcats men's basketball team
Players
Coaches

Pos.	#	Name	Height	Weight	Year	Previous school	Hometown
G	00	Adam Chiles	6 ft 1 in (1.85 m)	170 lb (77 kg)	Fr	Ballard	Louisville, Kentucky
G	1	Cliff Hawkins	6 ft 1 in (1.85 m)	190 lb (86 kg)	So	Oak Hill Academy (VA)	Dumfries, Virginia
G	2	Rashaad Carruth	6 ft 3 in (1.91 m)	180 lb (82 kg)	Fr	Oak Hill Academy (VA)	College Park, Georgia
G	3	J. P. Blevins	6 ft 2 in (1.88 m)	181 lb (82 kg)	Sr	Metcalfe County	Edmonton, Kentucky
G	4	Gerald Fitch	6 ft 3 in (1.91 m)	190 lb (86 kg)	So	Westside	Macon, Georgia
G	5	Josh Carrier	6 ft 4 in (1.93 m)	205 lb (93 kg)	Fr	Bowling Green	Bowling Green, Kentucky
G	10	Keith Bogans	6 ft 5 in (1.96 m)	213 lb (97 kg)	Jr	DeMatha	Washington D.C.
F	14	Erik Daniels	6 ft 8 in (2.03 m)	215 lb (98 kg)	So	Princeton	Cincinnati, Ohio
G	15	Matt Heissenbuttel	6 ft 4 in (1.93 m)	190 lb (86 kg)	So	Lexington Catholic	Lexington, Kentucky
F	21	Tayshaun Prince	6 ft 9 in (2.06 m)	213 lb (97 kg)	Sr	Dominguez	Compton, California
F	24	Marvin Stone	6 ft 10 in (2.08 m)	268 lb (122 kg)	Jr	Grissom	Huntsville, Alabama
F	33	Cory Sears	6 ft 6 in (1.98 m)	195 lb (88 kg)	So	Hargrave (VA)	Corbin, Kentucky
F	40	Jules Camara	6 ft 11 in (2.11 m)	211 lb (96 kg)	Jr	Oak Hill Academy (VA)	Dakar, Senegal
F	42	Jason Parker (redshirt)	6 ft 8 in (2.03 m)	255 lb (116 kg)	So	Fork Union (VA)	Charlotte, North Carolina
F	44	Chuck Hayes	6 ft 6 in (1.98 m)	240 lb (109 kg)	Fr	Modesto Christian	Modesto, California
F	50	Marquis Estill	6 ft 9 in (2.06 m)	236 lb (107 kg)	Jr	Madison Central	Richmond, Kentucky

Head coach

- Tubby Smith (High Point)

Assistant coach(es)

- David Hobbs (VCU)
- Scott Rigot (Buffalo)
- Reggie Hanson (Kentucky)

Legend

- (C) Team captain
- (S) Suspended
- (I) Ineligible
- (W) Walk-on
- Injured
- Current redshirt

Roster
Last update: March 5, 2014

== Schedule and results ==
Date time, TV	Rank^{#}	Opponent^{#}	Result	Record	High points	High rebounds	High assists	Site (attendance) city, state
Exhibition
November 6, 2001*; 7:30 pm	No. 4	Nike Elite	W 107–80	–	19 – Bogans	13 – Hayes	4 – Tied	Rupp Arena (16,361); Lexington, KY
November 11, 2001*; 7:30 pm	No. 4	Athletes in Action	W 88–83 ^{OT}	–	19 – Prince	7 – Bogans	3 – Bogans	Rupp Arena (16,036); Lexington, KY
Regular Season
November 15, 2001*; 8:00 pm, Fox Sports Ohio	No. 4	Western Kentucky; NABC Classic	L 52–64	0–1	12 – Tied	8 – Bogans	2 – Hawkins	Rupp Arena (21,104); Lexington, KY
November 16, 2001*; 6:00 pm, Fox Sports Ohio	No. 4	Marshall; NABC Classic	W 90–73	1–1	22 – Bogans	10 – Hayes	5 – Bogans	Rupp Arena (16,193); Lexington, KY
November 24, 2001*; 8:00 pm, UKTV	No. 10	Morehead State	W 90–73	2–1	23 – Prince	7 – Stone	6 – Bogans	Rupp Arena (19,774); Lexington, KY
November 28, 2001*; 8:00 pm, UKTV	No. 13	Kent State	W 82–68	3–1	19 – Tied	6 – Tied	6 – Hawkins	Firstar Center (10,352); Cincinnati, OH
December 5, 2001*; 7:30 pm, UKTV	No. 10	VMI	W 99–57	4–1	21 – Prince	10 – Prince	3 – Tied	Rupp Arena (18,077); Lexington, KY
December 8, 2001*; 4:00 pm, CBS	No. 11	North Carolina	W 79–59	5–1	31 – Prince	11 – Prince	4 – Prince	Rupp Arena (23,153); Lexington, KY
December 15, 2001*; 1:00 pm, UKTV	No. 9	Kentucky State	W 118–63	6–1	21 – Estill	7 – Estill	8 – Hawkins	Rupp Arena (18,500); Lexington, KY
December 18, 2001*; 9:00 pm, ESPN	No. 7	vs. No. 1 Duke; Jimmy V Classic	L 92–95 ^{OT}	6–2	19 – Carruth	11 – Camara	3 – Tied	Continental Airlines Arena (18,500); East Rutherford, NJ
December 22, 2001*; 5:00 pm, CBS	No. 7	vs. Indiana	W 66–52	7–2	17 – Tied	11 – Prince	5 – Hawkins	RCA Dome (29,379); Indianapolis, IN
December 29, 2001*; 4:00 pm, CBS	No. 6	Louisville; Battle for the Bluegrass	W 82–62	8–2	18 – Prince	9 – Prince	5 – Hawkins	Rupp Arena (24,330); Lexington, KY
January 2, 2002*; 8:00 pm, UKTV	No. 6	Tulane	W 101–67	9–2	22 – Prince	10 – Fitch	5 – Hawkins	Freedom Hall (16,011); Louisville, KY
January 5, 2002; 2:00 pm, JP Sports	No. 6	at Mississippi State	L 69–74	9–3 (0–1)	18 – Prince	8 – Fitch	10 – Hawkins	Humphrey Coliseum (9,347); Starkville, MS
January 9, 2002; 7:00 pm, JP Sports	No. 8	Georgia	L 84–88	9–4 (0–2)	16 – Camara	6 – Tied	5 – Hawkins	Rupp Arena (21,707); Lexington, KY
January 12, 2002; 1:00 pm, JP Sports	No. 8	at South Carolina	W 51–50	10–4 (1–2)	11 – Fitch	8 – Estill	4 – Chiles	Frank McGuire Arena (12,097); Columbia, SC
January 15, 2002; 7:00 pm, ESPN	No. 12	Ole Miss	W 87–64	11–4 (2–2)	19 – Prince	11 – Fitch	6 – Hawkins	Rupp Arena (20,540); Lexington, KY
January 19, 2002*; 12:00 pm, CBS	No. 12	at Notre Dame	W 72–65	12–4 (2–2)	23 – Bogans	5 – Tied	6 – Hawkins	Joyce Center (11,418); South Bend, IN
January 22, 2002; 9:00 pm, ESPN	No. 8	at Auburn	W 69–62	13–4 (3–2)	21 – Estill	8 – Daniels	4 – Bogans	Beard-Eaves Memorial Coliseum (10,500); Auburn, AL
January 26, 2002; 8:00 pm, ESPN	No. 8	No. 14 Alabama	L 61–64	13–5 (3–3)	14 – Prince	8 – Fitch	3 – Hawkins	Rupp Arena (23,544); Lexington, KY
January 29, 2002; 9:00 pm, ESPN	No. 10	at No. 5 Florida	W 69–62	14–5 (4–3)	20 – Bogans	10 – Prince	4 – Bogans	O'Connell Center (12,212); Gainesville, FL
February 2, 2002; 1:00 pm, JP Sports	No. 8	South Carolina	W 91–74	15–5 (5–3)	17 – Fitch	9 – Fitch	3 – Tied	Rupp Arena (21,731); Lexington, KY
February 6, 2002; 8:00 pm, JP Sports	No. 7	at Tennessee	L 74–76 ^{OT}	15–6 (5–4)	22 – Prince	7 – Tied	4 – Hawkins	Thompson-Boling Arena (17,260); Knoxville, TN
February 9, 2002; 1:00 pm, JP Sports	No. 7	at LSU	W 68–56	16–6 (6–4)	18 – Prince	8 – Fitch	9 – Hawkins	Maravich Center (8,549); Baton Rouge, LA
February 13, 2002; 7:00 pm, JP Sports	No. 10	Vanderbilt	W 67–59	17–6 (7–4)	20 – Prince	7 – Estill	3 – Tied	Rupp Arena (20,173); Lexington, KY
February 16, 2002; 1:00 pm, CBS	No. 10	at No. 21 Georgia	L 69–78	17–7 (7–5)	17 – Tied	7 – Estill	5 – Bogans	Stegeman Coliseum (10,523); Athens, GA
February 19, 2002; 9:00 pm, ESPN	No. 12	Tennessee	W 64–61	18–7 (8–5)	17 – Camara	8 – Camara	3 – Hawkins	Rupp Arena (20,662); Lexington, KY
February 23, 2002; 12:00 pm, CBS	No. 12	Arkansas	W 71–58	19–7 (9–5)	16 – Prince	10 – Prince	5 – Hawkins	Rupp Arena (22,109); Lexington, KY
February 27, 2002; 8:00 pm, JP Sports	No. 11	at Vanderbilt	L 73–86	19–8 (9–6)	24 – Prince	9 – Camara	6 – Hawkins	Memorial Gymnasium (14,168); Nashville
March 2, 2002; 12:00 pm, CBS	No. 11	No. 8 Florida	W 70–67	20–8 (10–6)	13 – Prince	7 – Camara	2 – Tied	Rupp Arena (23,606); Lexington, KY
SEC Tournament
March 8, 2002; 9:45 pm, JP Sports	(2 E) No. 12	vs. (6 E) South Carolina; SEC Tournament quarterfinals	L 57–70	20–9	13 – Bogans	13 – Hayes	2 – Tied	Georgia Dome (22,508); Atlanta, GA
NCAA Tournament
March 14, 2002*; 12:25 pm, CBS	(4 E) No. 16	vs. (13 E) Valparaiso; First Round	W 83–68	21–9	21 – Bogans	6 – Bogans	4 – Hawkins	Edward Jones Dome (25,251); St. Louis, MO
March 16, 2002*; 5:30 pm, CBS	(4 E) No. 16	vs. (12 E) Tulsa; Second Round	W 87–82	22–9	41 – Prince	9 – Prince	4 – Tied	Edward Jones Dome (31,484); St. Louis, MO
March 22, 2002*; 9:55 pm, CBS	(4 E) No. 16	vs. (1 E) No. 4 Maryland; Sweet Sixteen	L 68–78	22–10	17 – Prince	8 – Camara	7 – Hawkins	Carrier Dome (29,633); Syracuse, NY
*Non-conference game. ^{#}Rankings from AP Poll. (#) Tournament seedings in parentheses. All times are in Eastern Time.
