= 2002 NCAA Division I men's basketball tournament =

Edition of USA college basketball tournament

- Season: 2001–02
- Teams: 65
- Finals site: Georgia Dome, Atlanta, Georgia
- Champions: Maryland Terrapins (1st title, 1st title game, 2nd Final Four)
- Runner-up: Indiana Hoosiers (6th title game, 8th Final Four)
- Semifinalists: Kansas Jayhawks (11th Final Four); Oklahoma Sooners (4th Final Four)
- Winning coach: Gary Williams (1st title)
- MOP: Juan Dixon (Maryland)
- Attendance: 720,433
- Top scorers: Juan Dixon (Maryland); Jared Jeffries (Indiana) (155 points)

The 2002 NCAA Division I men's basketball tournament involved 65 schools playing in single-elimination play to determine the national champion of men's NCAA Division I college basketball. The 64th annual edition of the tournament began on March 12, 2002, and ended with the championship game on April 1 in Atlanta at the Georgia Dome. A total of 64 games were played.

This was the first year that the tournament used the so-called "pod" system, in which the eight first- and second-round sites are distributed around the four regionals. Teams were assigned to first round spots in order to minimize travel for as many teams as possible. The top seeds at each site were:

- Sacramento: Oregon (M2), USC (S4)
- Albuquerque: Arizona (W3), Ohio State (W4)
- Dallas: Oklahoma (W2), Mississippi State (M3)
- St. Louis: Kansas (M1), Kentucky (E4)
- Chicago: Georgia (E3), Illinois (M4)
- Pittsburgh: Cincinnati (W1), Pittsburgh (S3)
- Washington, D.C.: Maryland (E1), Connecticut (E2)
- Greenville: Duke (S1), Alabama (S2)

The Final Four consisted of Maryland, making their second consecutive appearance, Kansas, making their first appearance since 1993, Indiana, making their first appearance since 1992, and Oklahoma, making their first appearance since their national runner-up finish in 1988.

Maryland defeated Indiana 64–52 in the championship game to win their first-ever national championship. Juan Dixon of Maryland was named the tournament's Most Outstanding Player. He would go on to be drafted 17th overall by the Washington Wizards in the 2002 NBA Draft.

For the second straight tournament, the Elite Eight featured at least one double-digit seed. South Region tenth-seed Kent State and West Region twelfth-seed Missouri played in their respective regional finals, with Kent State losing to Indiana and Missouri losing to Oklahoma. This also marked the first time since 1987 that no team from the states of North Carolina nor Kentucky reached the Final Four.

This tournament was the first since 1974 (the last tournament which only allowed one team per conference) in which the North Carolina Tar Heels were not a participant. The 27-year streak was, at the time, the longest appearance streak in NCAA history, having beaten UCLA's 15-year streak in 1990. It has since been topped by Kansas, whose 35-year streak dates back to 1990 and is still active. (Two other active teams, Michigan State and Gonzaga, also have active 20 year streaks and could beat UNC's streak in 2026 and 2027, respectively.)

== Schedule and venues ==
2002 play-in game (orange) and first and second rounds (green)
2002 Regionals (blue) and Final Four (red)

The following are the sites selected to host each round of the 2002 tournament:

Opening Round

- March 12
  - University of Dayton Arena, Dayton, Ohio (Host: University of Dayton)

First and Second Rounds

- March 14 and 16
  - ARCO Arena, Sacramento, California (Host: University of the Pacific)
  - BI-LO Center, Greenville, South Carolina (Hosts: Southern Conference, Furman University)
  - Edward Jones Dome, St. Louis, Missouri (Host: Missouri Valley Conference)
  - University Arena, Albuquerque, New Mexico (Host: University of New Mexico)
- March 15 and 17
  - American Airlines Center, Dallas, Texas (Host: Big 12 Conference)
  - MCI Center, Washington, D.C. (Host: Georgetown University)
  - Mellon Arena, Pittsburgh, Pennsylvania (Host: Duquesne University)
  - United Center, Chicago, Illinois (Host: Big Ten Conference)

Regional semifinals and finals (Sweet Sixteen and Elite Eight)

- March 21 and 23
  - South Regional
    - Rupp Arena, Lexington, Kentucky (Host: University of Kentucky)
  - West Regional
    - Compaq Center at San Jose, San Jose, California (Host: Santa Clara University)
- March 22 and 24
  - East Regional
    - Carrier Dome, Syracuse, New York (Host: Syracuse University)
  - Midwest Regional
    - Kohl Center, Madison, Wisconsin (Host: University of Wisconsin–Madison)

National semifinals and championship (Final Four and championship)

- March 30 and April 1
  - Georgia Dome, Atlanta, Georgia (Host: Georgia Institute of Technology)

== Qualifying teams ==
=== Automatic bids ===
The following teams were automatic qualifiers for the 2002 NCAA field by virtue of winning their conference's tournament (except for the Ivy League, whose regular-season champion received the automatic bid).

Conference	School	Appearance	Last bid
ACC	Duke	26th	2001
America East	Boston University	6th	1997
Atlantic 10	Xavier	14th	2001
Atlantic Sun	Florida Atlantic	1st	Never
Big 12	Oklahoma	21st	2001
Big East	Connecticut	23rd	2000
Big Sky	Montana	5th	1997
Big South	Winthrop	4th	2001
Big Ten	Ohio State	22nd	2001
Big West	UC Santa Barbara	3rd	1990
Colonial	UNC Wilmington	2nd	2000
C-USA	Cincinnati	21st	2001
Horizon	Illinois–Chicago	2nd	1998
Ivy League	Penn	19th	2000
MAAC	Siena	3rd	1999
MAC	Kent State	3rd	2001
MEAC	Hampton	2nd	2001
Mid-Con	Valparaiso	6th	2000
Missouri Valley	Creighton	13th	2001
Mountain West	San Diego State	4th	1985
Northeast	Central Connecticut State	2nd	2000
Ohio Valley	Murray State	11th	1999
Pac-10	Arizona	21st	2001
Patriot	Holy Cross	10th	2001
SEC	Mississippi State	5th	1996
Southern	Davidson	7th	1998
Southland	McNeese State	2nd	1989
Sun Belt	Western Kentucky	18th	2001
SWAC	Alcorn State	6th	1999
WAC	Hawaii	4th	2001
West Coast	Gonzaga	5th	2001

=== Listed by region and seeding ===
East Regional – Syracuse
Seed	School	Conference	Record	Berth Type
#1	Maryland	ACC	26–4	At-large
#2	Connecticut	Big East	24–6	Automatic
#3	Georgia	SEC	21–9	At-large
#4	Kentucky	SEC	20–9	At-large
#5	Marquette	C-USA	26–6	At-large
#6	Texas Tech	Big 12	23–8	At-large
#7	NC State	ACC	22–10	At-large
#8	Wisconsin	Big Ten	18–12	At-large
#9	St. John's	Big East	20–11	At-large
#10	Michigan State	Big Ten	19–11	At-large
#11	Southern Illinois	Missouri Valley	26–7	At-large
#12	Tulsa	WAC	26–6	At-large
#13	Valparaiso	Mid-Continent	25–7	Automatic
#14	Murray State	OVC	19–12	Automatic
#15	Hampton	MEAC	26–6	Automatic
#16	Siena	MAAC	16–18	Automatic
#16	Alcorn State	SWAC	21–9	Automatic

South Regional – Lexington
Seed	School	Conference	Record	Berth Type
#1	Duke	ACC	29–3	Automatic
#2	Alabama	SEC	26–7	At-large
#3	Pittsburgh	Big East	27–5	At-large
#4	USC	Pac-10	22–9	At-large
#5	Indiana	Big Ten	20–11	At-large
#6	California	Pac-10	21–8	At-large
#7	Oklahoma State	Big 12	23–8	At-large
#8	Notre Dame	Big East	21–10	At-large
#9	Charlotte	C-USA	18–11	At-large
#10	Kent State	MAC	27–5	Automatic
#11	Penn	Ivy League	25–6	Automatic
#12	Utah	Mountain West	21–8	At-large
#13	UNC Wilmington	CAA	22–9	Automatic
#14	Central Connecticut State	NEC	27–4	Automatic
#15	Florida Atlantic	Atlantic Sun	19–11	Automatic
#16	Winthrop	Big South	19–11	Automatic

Midwest Regional – Madison
Seed	School	Conference	Record	Berth Type
#1	Kansas	Big 12	29–3	At-large
#2	Oregon	Pac-10	23–8	At-large
#3	Mississippi State	SEC	26–7	Automatic
#4	Illinois	Big Ten	24–8	At-large
#5	Florida	SEC	22–8	At-large
#6	Texas	Big 12	20–11	At-large
#7	Wake Forest	ACC	20–12	At-large
#8	Stanford	Pac-10	19–9	At-large
#9	Western Kentucky	Sun Belt	28–3	Automatic
#10	Pepperdine	WCC	22–8	At-large
#11	Boston College	Big East	20–11	At-large
#12	Creighton	Missouri Valley	22–8	Automatic
#13	San Diego State	Mountain West	21–11	Automatic
#14	McNeese State	Southland	21–8	Automatic
#15	Montana	Big Sky	16–14	Automatic
#16	Holy Cross	Patriot	18–14	Automatic

West Regional – San Jose
Seed	School	Conference	Record	Berth Type
#1	Cincinnati	C-USA	30–3	Automatic
#2	Oklahoma	Big 12	27–4	Automatic
#3	Arizona	Pac-10	22–9	Automatic
#4	Ohio State	Big Ten	23–7	Automatic
#5	Miami (FL)	Big East	24–7	At-large
#6	Gonzaga	WCC	29–3	Automatic
#7	Xavier	Atlantic 10	25–5	Automatic
#8	UCLA	Pac-10	19–11	At-Large
#9	Ole Miss	SEC	20–10	At-large
#10	Hawaii	WAC	27–5	Automatic
#11	Wyoming	Mountain West	21–8	At-large
#12	Missouri	Big 12	21–11	At-large
#13	Davidson	Southern	21–9	Automatic
#14	UC Santa Barbara	Big West	20–10	Automatic
#15	Illinois–Chicago	Horizon	20–13	Automatic
#16	Boston University	America East	22–9	Automatic

=== Bids by conference ===
Bids	Conference	Schools
6	Big 12	Kansas, Missouri, Oklahoma, Oklahoma State, Texas, Texas Tech
6	Big East	Boston College, Connecticut, Miami (FL), Notre Dame, Pittsburgh, St. John's
6	Pac-10	Arizona, California, Oregon, Stanford, UCLA, USC
6	SEC	Alabama, Florida, Georgia, Kentucky, Mississippi State, Ole Miss
5	Big Ten	Illinois, Indiana, Michigan State, Ohio State, Wisconsin
4	ACC	Duke, Maryland, NC State, Wake Forest
3	C-USA	Charlotte, Cincinnati, Marquette
3	Mountain West	San Diego State, Utah, Wyoming
2	Missouri Valley	Creighton, Southern Illinois
2	WAC	Hawaii, Tulsa
2	West Coast	Gonzaga, Pepperdine
1	20 other conferences	

== Final Four ==
At Georgia Dome, Atlanta

=== National semifinals ===
- March 30, 2002
  - Maryland (E1) 97, Kansas (M1) 88
  For the second straight year the Maryland Terrapins earned a bid to the Final Four. This time they would take advantage of their trip. After falling behind 13–2 to the Kansas Jayhawks to begin the game, Maryland stormed to a 44–37 lead at halftime. They expanded their lead to 20, 83–63, with 6:11 left in the game. Roy Williams' Kansas squad did not quit and closed the gap to 4 with under a minute remaining, but the Terps survived to advance to the championship, 97–88. Maryland senior Juan Dixon led the contest in scoring with 33.
  - Indiana (S5) 73, Oklahoma (W2) 64
  Mike Davis's Indiana Hoosiers continued their Cinderella ride in the NCAA tournament by defeating another higher ranked team, the Oklahoma Sooners. Oklahoma led most of the first half, and took a 34–30 lead into halftime. However, with the score 60–60 late in the 2nd half Indiana broke ahead for good with an easy bucket from Jeff Newton, who led the Hoosiers with 19 points. The Hoosiers outscored the Sooners by 13 in the 2nd half and advanced to the championship game with a 73–64 victory. Oklahoma was coached by Kelvin Sampson, who later in his career would succeed Davis as IU head coach. This was the first men's final four where all four teams had a unique nickname among D-I schools.

=== Championship game ===
- April 1, 2002
  - Maryland (E1) 64, Indiana (S5) 52
  The Maryland Terrapins completed the task they set out to do one year earlier by defeating the Indiana Hoosiers 64–52. Maryland led virtually the entire game except for a brief point with 9:52 left in the basketball game when Indiana took a 44–42 lead. Maryland answered the Hoosier run and ended the game with a 22–8 run to bring home the school's first and coach Gary Williams's only men's basketball National Championship. Senior Juan Dixon was named the tournament's Most Outstanding Player (MOP).

== Bracket ==
=== Opening Round game ===
Winner advances to 16th seed in East Regional vs. (1) Maryland.

Opening Round game March 12
16a	Siena	81
16b	Alcorn State	77

=== East Regional — Syracuse, New York ===
First round
1	Maryland	85
16	Siena	70
Washington, D.C. - Fri/Sun
8	Wisconsin	80
9	St. John's	70
5	Marquette	69
12	Tulsa	71
St. Louis - Thu/Sat
4	Kentucky	83
13	Valparaiso	68
6	Texas Tech	68
11	Southern Illinois	76
Chicago - Fri/Sun
3	Georgia	85
14	Murray State	68
7	NC State	69
10	Michigan State	58
Washington, D.C. - Fri/Sun
2	Connecticut	78
15	Hampton	67

Quarter-finals
1	Maryland	87
8	Wisconsin	57
12	Tulsa	82
4	Kentucky	87
11	Southern Illinois	77
3	Georgia	75
7	NC State	74
2	Connecticut	77

Regional semifinals
1	Maryland	78
4	Kentucky	68
11	Southern Illinois	59
2	Connecticut	71

Regional Finals
1	Maryland	90
2	Connecticut	82

==== Regional Final Summary ====
CBS

Sunday, March 24

box score

#1 Maryland Terrapins 90, #2 Connecticut Huskies 82
Scoring by half: 44–37, 46–45
Pts: L. Baxter – 29; Rebs: L. Baxter – 9 Asts: S. Blake – 6	Pts: C. Butler – 33; Rebs: C. Butler – 7 Asts: C. Butler – 4

Carrier Dome – Syracuse, NY
Attendance: 29,252
Referees: Tom Rucker, Zelton Steed, Dick Cartmell

=== Midwest Regional — Madison, Wisconsin ===
First round
1	Kansas	70
16	Holy Cross	59
St. Louis - Thu/Sat
8	Stanford	84
9	Western Kentucky	68
5	Florida	82
12	Creighton	83^{2OT}
Chicago - Fri/Sun
4	Illinois	93
13	San Diego State	64
6	Texas	70
11	Boston College	57
Dallas - Fri/Sun
3	Mississippi State	70
14	McNeese State	58
7	Wake Forest	83
10	Pepperdine	74
Sacramento - Thu/Sat
2	Oregon	81
15	Montana	62

Quarter-finals
1	Kansas	86
8	Stanford	63
12	Creighton	60
4	Illinois	72
6	Texas	68
3	Mississippi State	64
7	Wake Forest	87
2	Oregon	92

Regional semifinals
1	Kansas	73
4	Illinois	69
6	Texas	70
2	Oregon	72

Regional Finals
1	Kansas	104
2	Oregon	86

==== Regional Final Summary ====
CBS

Sunday, March 24

box score

#1 Kansas Jayhawks 104, #2 Oregon Ducks 86
Scoring by half: 48–42, 56–44
Pts: N. Collison – 25; Rebs: D. Gooden – 20; Asts: A. Miles – 8	Pts: F. Jones – 32; Rebs: R. Johnson – 10; Asts: L. Ridnour – 7

Kohl Center – Madison, WI
Attendance: 16,310
Referees: Jim Burr, Leslie Jones, Tom Lopes

=== South Regional — Lexington, Kentucky ===
First round
1	Duke	84
16	Winthrop	37
Greenville - Thu/Sat
8	Notre Dame	82
9	Charlotte	63
5	Indiana	75
12	Utah	56
Sacramento - Thu/Sat
4	USC	89
13	UNC Wilmington	93^{OT}
6	California	82
11	Pennsylvania	75
Pittsburgh - Fri/Sun
3	Pittsburgh	71
14	Central Connecticut State	54
7	Oklahoma State	61
10	Kent State	69
Greenville - Thu/Sat
2	Alabama	86
15	Florida Atlantic	78

Quarter-finals
1	Duke	84
8	Notre Dame	77
5	Indiana	76
13	UNC Wilmington	67
6	California	50
3	Pittsburgh	63
10	Kent State	71
2	Alabama	58

Regional semifinals
1	Duke	73
5	Indiana	74
3	Pittsburgh	73
10	Kent State	78^{OT}

Regional Finals
5	Indiana	81
10	Kent State	69

==== Regional Final Summary ====
CBS

Saturday, March 23
7:00 p.m. EST

box score

#5 Indiana Hoosiers 81, #10 Kent State Golden Flashes 69
Scoring by half: 40–28, 41–41
Pts: D. Fife – 17; Rebs: J. Jeffries – 7 Asts: T. Coverdale, K. Hornsby – 7	Pts: A. Gates – 22; Rebs: A. Gates, D. Shaw – 8 Asts: T. Huffman – 4

Rupp Arena – Lexington, KY
Attendance: 22,435
Referees: Mark Whitehead, Scott Thornley, Tom Nunez

=== West Regional — San Jose, California ===
First round
1	Cincinnati	90
16	Boston University	52
Pittsburgh - Fri/Sun
8	UCLA	80
9	Ole Miss	58
5	Miami (FL)	80
12	Missouri	93
Albuquerque - Thu/Sat
4	~~Ohio State~~	69
13	Davidson	64
6	Gonzaga	66
11	Wyoming	73
Albuquerque - Thu/Sat
3	Arizona	86
14	UC-Santa Barbara	81
7	Xavier	70
10	Hawaii	58
Dallas - Fri/Sun
2	Oklahoma	71
15	Illinois-Chicago	63

Quarter-finals
1	Cincinnati	101
8	UCLA	105^{2OT}
12	Missouri	83
4	~~Ohio State~~	67
11	Wyoming	60
3	Arizona	68
7	Xavier	65
2	Oklahoma	78

Regional semifinals
8	UCLA	73
12	Missouri	82
3	Arizona	67
2	Oklahoma	88

Regional Finals
12	Missouri	75
2	Oklahoma	81

Ohio State vacated all 32 games including its NCAA tournament appearance from the 2001–02 season due to the Jim O’Brien scandal. Unlike forfeiture, a vacated game does not result in the other school being credited with a win, only with Ohio State removing the wins from its own record.

==== Regional Final Summary ====
CBS

Saturday, March 23

box score

#2 Oklahoma Sooners 81, #12 Missouri Tigers 75
Scoring by half: 41–32, 40–43
Pts: H. Price – 18; Rebs: Q. White, D, Selvy – 7 Asts: Q. White – 7	Pts: R. Paulding – 22; Rebs: T. Bryant – 9 Asts: W. Stokes, R. Paulding – 4

Compaq Center – San Jose, CA
Attendance: 18,040
Referees: John Cahill, Terry Moore, John Hughes

=== Final Four — Atlanta, Georgia ===
National semifinals
E1	Maryland	97
M1	Kansas	88
S5	Indiana	73
W2	Oklahoma	64

National Championship Game
E1	Maryland	64
S5	Indiana	52

== Broadcast information ==
ESPN broadcast the opening-round game, then turned coverage over to CBS Sports for the remaining 63 games. They were carried on a regional basis until the "Elite Eight", at which point all games were shown nationally.

Westwood One had exclusive radio coverage.

=== ESPN announcers ===
- Mike Tirico and Len Elmore – Opening Round game at Dayton, Ohio

=== CBS Sports announcers ===
- Jim Nantz/Billy Packer/Bonnie Bernstein – First and Second Rounds at Washington, D.C.; East Regional at Syracuse, New York; Final Four and National Championship at Atlanta, Georgia
- Dick Enberg/Matt Guokas/Armen Keteyian – First and Second Rounds at St. Louis, Missouri; South Regional at Lexington, Kentucky
- Verne Lundquist/Bill Raftery/Lesley Visser – First and Second Rounds at Pittsburgh, Pennsylvania; Midwest Regional at Madison, Wisconsin
- Gus Johnson/Dan Bonner/Solomon Wilcots – First and Second Rounds at Albuquerque, New Mexico; West Regional at San Jose, California
- Kevin Harlan/Jon Sundvold/Spencer Tillman – First and Second Rounds at Greenville, South Carolina
- Ian Eagle/Jim Spanarkel/Dwayne Ballen – First and Second Rounds at Sacramento, California
- Craig Bolerjack/Bob Wenzel/Brett Haber – First and Second Rounds at Dallas, Texas
- Tim Brando/Eddie Fogler/Charles Davis – First and Second Rounds at Chicago, Illinois

=== Westwood One announcers ===
- Marty Brennaman and Larry Conley, 1st and 2nd Rounds at Greenville, South Carolina and South Regionals at Lexington, Kentucky

== See also ==
- 2002 NCAA Division II men's basketball tournament
- 2002 NCAA Division III men's basketball tournament
- 2002 NCAA Division I women's basketball tournament
- 2002 NCAA Division II women's basketball tournament
- 2002 NCAA Division III women's basketball tournament
- 2002 National Invitation Tournament
- 2002 Women's National Invitation Tournament
- 2002 NAIA Division I men's basketball tournament
- 2002 NAIA Division II men's basketball tournament
- 2002 NAIA Division I women's basketball tournament
- 2002 NAIA Division II women's basketball tournament
