= 2002 SEC men's basketball tournament =

- Classification: Division I
- Season: 2001–02
- Teams: 12
- Site: Georgia Dome; Atlanta, Georgia
- Champions: Mississippi State (2nd title)
- Winning coach: Rick Stansbury (1st title)
- MVP: Mario Austin (Mississippi State)
- Attendance: 172,840
- Top scorer: Antonio Hudson (LSU) (63 points)

2001–02 Southeastern Conference men's basketball standings
	Conf.				Overall
Team	W		L	PCT	W		L	PCT
East
No. 15 Florida	10	–	6	.625	22	–	9	.710
No. 16 Kentucky	10	–	6	.625	22	–	10	.688
No. 23 Georgia	10	–	6	.625	22	–	10	.688
Tennessee	7	–	9	.438	15	–	16	.484
South Carolina	6	–	10	.375	22	–	15	.595
Vanderbilt	6	–	10	.375	17	–	15	.531
West
No. 8 Alabama	12	–	4	.750	27	–	8	.771
No. 17 Mississippi State †	10	–	6	.625	27	–	8	.771
Ole Miss	9	–	7	.563	20	–	11	.645
LSU	6	–	10	.375	19	–	15	.559
Arkansas	6	–	10	.375	14	–	15	.483
Auburn	4	–	12	.250	12	–	16	.429
† 2002 SEC tournament winner Rankings from AP Poll

The 2002 SEC men's basketball tournament took place on March 7–10, 2002 in Atlanta, Georgia at the Georgia Dome. The first, quarterfinal, and semifinal rounds were televised by Jefferson Pilot Sports, and the SEC Championship Game was televised by CBS.

Mississippi State were the champions.

== Bracket ==
First round
E5	Vanderbilt	62
W4	LSU	69
W6	Auburn	63
E3	#11 Florida	81
W5	Arkansas	61
E4	Tennessee	68
E6	South Carolina	69
W3	Ole Miss	67

Second Round
E1	#17 Georgia	76
W4	LSU	78
W2	Mississippi State	62
E3	#11 Florida	52
W1	#8 Alabama	91
E4	Tennessee	72
E2	#12 Kentucky	57
E6	South Carolina	70

Semifinals
W4	LSU	51
W2	Mississippi State	57
W1	#8 Alabama	65
E6	South Carolina	61

Championship game
W2	Mississippi State	61
W1	#8 Alabama	58
