= 2001–02 Big East Conference men's basketball season =

American college basketball season

2001–02 Big East Conference Men's Basketball Season
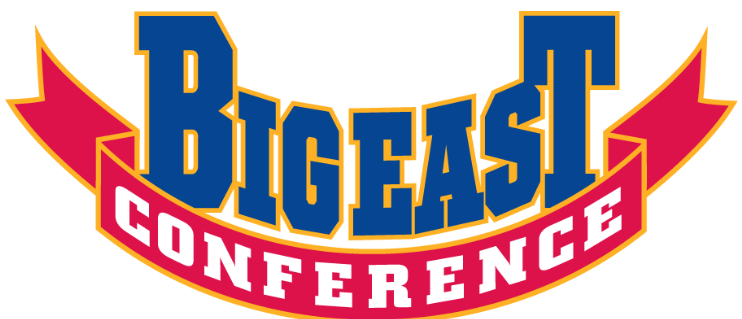
- League: NCAA Division I
- Sport: Basketball
- Duration: November 16, 2001 through March 9, 2002
- Teams: 14
- TV partner: ESPN

Regular Season
- Champion: Connecticut (East, 13–3); Pittsburgh (West, 13–3)
- Season MVP: Caron Butler – Connecticut and Brandin Knight – Pittsburgh

Tournament
- Champions: Connecticut
- Finals MVP: Caron Butler – Connecticut

Basketball seasons
- 2000–01 2002–03

2001–02 Big East men's basketball standings
| | Conf. | | | | Overall |
| Team | W | | L | PCT | W | | L | PCT |
|---|---|---|---|---|---|---|---|---|
East
| No. 10 Connecticut† | 13 | – | 3 | .813 | 27 | – | 7 | .794 |
| No. 21 Miami | 10 | – | 6 | .625 | 24 | – | 8 | .750 |
| Boston College | 8 | – | 8 | .500 | 20 | – | 12 | .625 |
| Villanova | 7 | – | 9 | .438 | 19 | – | 13 | .594 |
| Providence | 6 | – | 10 | .375 | 15 | – | 16 | .484 |
| Virginia Tech* | 4 | – | 12 | .250 | 10 | – | 18 | .357 |
| St. John's# | 0 | – | 7 | .000 | 7 | – | 11 | .389 |
West
| No. 9 Pittsburgh | 13 | – | 3 | .813 | 29 | – | 6 | .829 |
| Notre Dame | 10 | – | 6 | .625 | 22 | – | 11 | .667 |
| Georgetown | 9 | – | 7 | .563 | 19 | – | 11 | .633 |
| Syracuse | 9 | – | 7 | .563 | 23 | – | 13 | .639 |
| Rutgers | 8 | – | 8 | .500 | 18 | – | 13 | .581 |
| Seton Hall | 5 | – | 11 | .313 | 12 | – | 18 | .400 |
| West Virginia* | 1 | – | 15 | .063 | 8 | – | 20 | .286 |
† 2002 Big East tournament winner As of April 1, 2002; Rankings from AP Poll; *Did not qualify for 2002 Big East tournament. #St. John's had 14 regular-season games vacated due to sanctions against the program; the school′s disputed record was 9–7, 20–12.

The 2001–02 Big East Conference men's basketball season was the 23rd in conference history, and involved its 14 full-time member schools.

Connecticut was the regular-season champion of the East Division with a record of 13–3, and Pittsburgh won the West Division, also with a record of 13–3. Connecticut won the Big East tournament championship.

== Season summary & highlights ==
- For the second season, the Big East used a divisional structure, with an East Division and a West Division, each composed of seven teams. The divisional structure lasted through the 2002–03 season.
- Connecticut won the East Division regular-season championship with a record of 13–3. It was Connecticut's seventh regular-season championship or co-championship. It also was Connecticut's third division championship or co-championship and second outright division title. (Note: Under an earlier Big East divisional structure Connectiut won two outright Big East 6 Division championships, in the 1995–96 and 1997–98 season.)
- Pittsburgh won the West Division regular-season championship with a record of 13–3. It was Pittsburgh's third conference championship or co-championship and first division title.
- Connecticut won its fifth Big East tournament championship.
- St. John's later had 14 of its regular-season wins this season vacated due to sanctions imposed on the program for the use of an ineligible player.

== Head coaches ==
| School | Coach | Season | Notes |
|---|---|---|---|
| Boston College | Al Skinner | 5th | |
| Connecticut | Jim Calhoun | 16th | |
| Georgetown | Craig Esherick | 4th | |
| Miami | Perry Clark | 2nd | |
| Notre Dame | Mike Brey | 2nd | |
| Pittsburgh | Ben Howland | 3rd | Big East Coach of the Year |
| Providence | Tim Welsh | 4th | |
| Rutgers | Gary Waters | 1st | |
| St. John's | Mike Jarvis | 4th | |
| Seton Hall | Louis Orr | 1st | |
| Syracuse | Jim Boeheim | 26th | |
| Villanova | Jay Wright | 1st | |
| Virginia Tech | Ricky Stokes | 3rd | |
| West Virginia | Gale Catlett | 24th | Retired March 2, 2002 |

== Rankings ==
Boston College, Connecticut, Georgetown, Miami, Pittsburgh, and Syracuse spent time in the Associated Press poll Top 25 during the season. Pittsburgh finished at No. 9, Connecticut at No. 10, and Miami at No. 21.

2001–02 Big East Conference Weekly Rankings Key: ██ Increase in ranking. ██ Decrease in ranking.
| AP Poll | Pre | 11/19 | 11/26 | 12/3 | 12/10 | 12/17 | 12/24 | 12/31 | 1/7 | 1/14 | 1/21 | 1/28 | 2/4 | 2/11 | 2/18 | 2/25 | 3/4 | Final |
|---|---|---|---|---|---|---|---|---|---|---|---|---|---|---|---|---|---|---|
| Boston College | 17 | 17 | 15 | 13 | 11 | 10 | 11 | 11 | 16 | | | | | | | | | |
| Connecticut | | | | | | | | | | | 25 | 17 | | | | 23 | 19 | 10 |
| Georgetown | 14 | 16 | 18 | 19 | 18 | 16 | 20 | 24 | | | | | | | | | | |
| Miami | | | | | | | 24 | 21 | 21 | 24 | 22 | 15 | 12 | 13 | 17 | 22 | 20 | 21 |
| Notre Dame | | | | | | | | | | | | | | | | | | |
| Pittsburgh | | | | | | | | | 23 | | | 21 | | 14 | 11 | 10 | 7 | 9 |
| Providence | | | | | | | | | | | | | | | | | | |
| Rutgers | | | | | | | | | | | | | | | | | | |
| St. John's | | | | | | | | | | | | | | | | | | |
| Seton Hall | | | | | | | | | | | | | | | | | | |
| Syracuse | 21 | 18 | 12 | 9 | 13 | 18 | 18 | 16 | 12 | 8 | 12 | 14 | 23 | | | | | |
| Villanova | | | | | | | | | | | | | | | | | | |
| Virginia Tech | | | | | | | | | | | | | | | | | | |
| West Virginia | | | | | | | | | | | | | | | | | | |

== Regular-season statistical leaders ==
Scoring
| Name | School | PPG |
| Troy Bell | BC | 21.6 |
| Preston Shumpert | Syr | 20.7 |
| Caron Butler | Conn | 20.3 |
| Marcus Hatten | SJU | 20.1 |
| Michael Sweetney | GU | 19.0 |

Rebounding
| Name | School | RPG |
| Ryan Humphrey | ND | 10.9 |
| Rashod Kent | RU | 10.2 |
| Michael Sweetney | GU | 10.0 |
| Brooks Sales | Vill | 9.1 |
| Emeka Okafor | Conn | 9.0 |

Assists
| Name | School | APG |
| Chris Thomas | ND | 7.6 |
| Brandin Knight | Pitt | 7.2 |
| John Salmons | Mia | 6.1 |
| Kevin Braswell | GU | 5.8 |
| Taliek Brown | Conn | 5.1 |

Steals
| Name | School | SPG |
| John Linehan | Prov | 4.5 |
| Marcus Hatten | SJU | 3.3 |
| James Thues | SJU | 2.8 |
| Kevin Braswell | GU | 2.7 |
| Darius Lane | SHU | 2.4 |

Blocks
| Name | School | BPG |
| Emeka Okafor | Conn | 4.1 |
| Ryan Humphrey | ND | 2.8 |
| James Jones | Mia | 2.4 |
| Wesley Wilson | GU | 2.3 |
| Rashod Kent | RU | 1.8 |

Field Goals
| Name | School | FG% |
| Michael Sweetney | GU | .567 |
| Ryan Gomes | Prov | .559 |
| Chris Moss | WVU | .542 |
| Ricky Wright | Vill | .528 |
| Ryan Humphrey | ND | .489 |

3-Pt Field Goals
| Name | School | 3FG% |
| Brian Chase | VT | .423 |
| Gary Buchanan | Vill | .423 |
| Darius Lane | SHU | .389 |
| Brandon Knight | Pitt | .356 |
| Jerome Coleman | RU | .346 |

Free Throws
| Name | School | FT% |
| Gary Buchanan | Vill | .911 |
| Chris Thomas | ND | .889 |
| Troy Bell | BC | .883 |
| Jonathan Hargett | WVU | .881 |
| John Salmons | Mia | .842 |

== Postseason ==
=== Big East tournament ===
==== Seeding ====
Two teams — the seventh-place finishers in each division based on conference record, after the application of tiebreakers as necessary — did not qualify for the Big East Tournament. The remaining six teams in each division were seeded No. 1 through No. 6 by division based on conference record, again applying tiebreakers as necessary. Four teams — the No. 1 and No. 2 seeds in each division — received a bye into the quarterfinal round. Eight teams — the No. 3 through No. 6 seeds in each division — played in the first round. In the first round the No. 3 East seed played the No. 6 West seed, the No. 4 East seed played the No. 5 West seed, the No. 5 East seed played the No. 4 West seed, and the No. 6 East seed played the No. 3 West seed.

Seeding in the East Division was (1) Connecticut, (2) Miami, (3) St. John's, (4) Boston College, (5) Villanova, and (6) Providence. Seeding in the West Division was (1) Pittsburgh, (2) Notre Dame, (3) Georgetown, (4) Syracuse, (5) Rutgers, and (6) Seton Hall. The two seventh-place finishers that did not qualify for the tournament were Virginia Tech in the East Division and West Virginia in the West Division.

==== Bracket ====
First round
W5 | Rutgers | 55
E4 | Boston College | 60
E6 | Providence | 67
W3 | Georgetown | 68
E5 | Villanova | 78
W4 | Syracuse | 64
W6 | Seton Hall | 58
E3 | St. John's | 64

Quarterfinals
W1 | #7 Pittsburgh | 76
E4 | Boston College | 62
E2 | #20 Miami | 84^{OT}
W3 | Georgetown | 76
E1 | #19 Connecticut | 72
E5 | Villanova | 70
W2 | Notre Dame | 82
E3 | St John's | 63

Semifinals
W1 | #7 Pittsburgh | 76
E2 | #20 Miami | 71
E1 | #19 Connecticut | 82
W2 | Notre Dame | 77

Championship game
W1 | #7 Pittsburgh | 65
E1 | #19 Connecticut | 74^{2OT}

=== NCAA tournament ===
Six Big East teams received bids to the NCAA Tournament. Boston College, Miami, and St. John's lost in the first round and Notre Dame in the second round. Pittsburgh lost in the South Region semifinals an Connecticut in the East Region final.

| School | Region | Seed | Round 1 | Round 2 | Sweet 16 | Elite 8 |
|---|---|---|---|---|---|---|
| Connecticut | East | 2 | 15 Hampton, W 78–67 | 7 NC State, W 77–74 | 11 Southern Illinois, W 71–59 | 1 Maryland, L 90–82 |
| Pittsburgh | South | 3 | 14 Central Connecticut State, W 71–54 | 6 California, W 63–50 | 10 Kent State, L 78–73^{(OT)} | |
| Notre Dame | South | 8 | 9 Charlotte, W 82–63 | 1 Duke, L 84–77 | | |
| Miami | West | 5 | 12 Missouri, L 93–80 | | | |
| St. John's | East | 9 | 8 Wisconsin, L 80–70 | | | |
| Boston College | Midwest | 11 | 6 Texas, L 70–57 | | | |

=== National Invitation Tournament ===
Four Big East teams received bids to the National Invitation Tournament, which did not yet have seeding. Three teams accepted their bids and played in three of the tournament's four unnamed brackets. Rutgers lost in the first round and Villanova in the quarterfinals. Syracuse was defeated in the semifinals.

Georgetown declined its NIT bid. Head coach Craig Esherick explained his controversial decision by saying that Georgetown's home court, the MCI Center, was booked to host the East Regional of the 2002 NCAA Tournament, meaning that accepting the NIT invitation would have required the Hoyas to play on the road in the western United States for two weeks, forcing his players to miss many of their classes. After playing a similar schedule during the previous season in the 2001 NCAA tournament, Esherick had concluded that missing so many classes to play in the NCAA Tournament would have been worth it because of the chance to win a national championship, but that missing them to play in the NIT, a tournament which did not offer a chance for a national championship, was not in the best interest of Georgetown's players. Georgetown became only the second team in history to turn down an NIT bid, and the first to do so since Louisville turned down an invitation to the 1987 NIT.

| School | Opening round | Round 1 | Round 2 | Quarterfinals | Semifinals |
|---|---|---|---|---|---|
| Syracuse | Bye | St. Bonaventure, W 76–66 | Butler, W 66–65 | Richmond, W 62–46 | South Carolina, L 66–59 |
| Villanova | Bye | Manhattan, W 84–69 | Louisiana Tech, W 67–64 | Temple, L 63–57 | |
| Rutgers | Bye | Yale, L 67–65 | | | |
| Georgetown | Declined bid | | | | |

== Awards and honors ==
=== Big East Conference ===
Co-Players of the Year:

- Caron Butler, Connecticut, F, So.
- Brandin Knight, Pittsburgh, G, Jr.

Defensive Player of the Year:

- John Linehan, Providence, G, Sr.

Rookie of the Year:

- Chris Thomas, Notre Dame, G, Fr.

Most Improved Player:

- Brandin Knight, Pittsburgh, G, Jr.

Coach of the Year:

- Ben Howland, Pittsburgh (3rd season)

All-Big East First Team

- Caron Butler, Connecticut, F, So., 6 ft 7 in (201 cm), 217 lb (98 kg), Racine, Wis.
- Preston Shumpert, Syracuse, F, Sr., 6 ft 6 in (198 cm), 200 lb (91 kg), Muncie, Ind.
- Marcus Hatten, St. John's, G, Jr., 6 ft 1 in (185 cm), 165 lb (75 kg), Baltimore, Md.
- Brandin Knight, Pittsburgh, G, Jr., 6 ft 0 in (183 cm), 180 lb (82 kg), East Orange, N.J.
- Ryan Humphrey, Notre Dame, F, Sr., 6 ft 8 in (203 cm), 235 lb (107 kg), Tulsa, Okla.
- Michael Sweetney, Georgetown, F, So., 6 ft 8 in (203 cm), 275 lb (125 kg), Oxon Hill, Md.
- Troy Bell, Boston College, G, Jr., 6 ft 1 in (185 cm), 180 lb (82 kg), Minneapolis, Minn.

All-Big East Second Team:

- Darius Rice, Miami, F, So., 6 ft 10 in (208 cm), 222 lb (101 kg), Jackson, Miss.
- John Salmons, Miami, G, Sr., 6 ft 7 in (201 cm), 210 lb (95 kg), Plymouth Meeting, Pa.
- John Linehan, Providence, G, Sr., 5 ft 9 in (175 cm), 165 lb (75 kg), Chester, Pa.
- Rashod Kent, Rutgers, F, Sr., 6 ft 6 in (198 cm), 265 lb (120 kg), Fairmont, W.Va.
- Ricky Wright, Villanova, F, Jr., 6 ft 7 in (201 cm), 215 lb (98 kg), East Chicago, Ind.

All-Big East Third Team:

- James Jones, Miami, F, Jr.., 6 ft 8 in (203 cm), 225 lb (102 kg), Miami, Fla.
- Chris Thomas, Notre Dame, G, Fr., 6 ft 1 in (185 cm), 190 lb (86 kg), Indianapolis, Ind.
- Kevin Braswell, Georgetown, G, Sr., 6 ft 2 in (188 cm), 190 lb (86 kg), Baltimore, Md.
- Emeka Okafor, Connecticut, C, Fr., 6 ft 10 in (208 cm), 252 lb (114 kg), Houston, Tex.
- Deshaun Williams, Syracuse, G, Jr., 6 ft 3 in (191 cm), 205 lb (93 kg), Paterson, N.J.
- Chris Moss, West Virginia, F, Sr., 6 ft 8 in (203 cm), 225 lb (102 kg), Chesterfield, Va.

Big East All-Rookie Team:

- Ben Gordon, Connecticut, G, Fr., 6 ft 3 in (191 cm), 200 lb (91 kg), Mount Vernon, N.Y.
- Emeka Okafor, Connecticut, C, Fr., 6 ft 10 in (208 cm), 252 lb (114 kg), Houston, Tex.
- Chris Thomas, Notre Dame, G, Fr., 6 ft 1 in (185 cm), 190 lb (86 kg), Indianapolis, Ind.
- Ryan Gomes, Providence, F, Fr., 6 ft 7 in (201 cm), 250 lb (113 kg), Waterbury, Conn.
- John Allen, Seton Hall, F, Fr., 6 ft 5 in (196 cm), 207 lb (94 kg), Coatesville, Pa.

=== All-Americans ===
The following players were selected to the 2002 Associated Press All-America teams.

Third Team All-America:

- Brandin Knight, Pittsburgh, Key Stats: 15.6 ppg, 4.8 rpg, 7.2 apg, 2.3 spg, 42.7 FG%, 35.6 3P%, 546 points

AP Honorable Mention

- Troy Bell, Boston College
- Caron Butler, Connecticut
- John Linehan, Providence
- Preston Shumpert, Syracuse

== See also ==
- 2001–02 NCAA Division I men's basketball season
- 2001–02 Boston College Eagles men's basketball team
- 2001–02 Connecticut Huskies men's basketball team
- 2001–02 Georgetown Hoyas men's basketball team
- 2001–02 Miami Hurricanes men's basketball team
- 2001–02 Notre Dame Fighting Irish men's basketball team
- 2001–02 Pittsburgh Panthers men's basketball team
- 2001–02 St. John's Red Storm men's basketball team
- 2001–02 Syracuse Orangemen basketball team
