= 2002 in basketball =

The following are the basketball events of the year 2002 throughout the world.

== Championships ==
=== World Championship ===
- Men
  - Gold medal: Yugoslavia
  - Silver medal: Argentina
  - Bronze medal: Germany
  - Final match: Yugoslavia 84, Argentina 77
  - MVP: Dirk Nowitzki, Germany
  - All-tournament team: Nowitzki, Pero Cameron (New Zealand), Manu Ginóbili (Argentina), Peja Stojakovic (Yugoslavia), Yao Ming (China)
- Women
  - Gold medal: USA
  - Silver medal: Russia
  - Bronze medal: Australia
  - Final match: USA 79, Russia 74

=== Professional ===
- Men
  - 2002 NBA Finals: Los Angeles Lakers over the New Jersey Nets 4–0. MVP: Tim Duncan (More information can be found at 2002-03 NBA season.)
    - 2002 NBA Playoffs, 2002 NBA draft, 2001-02 NBA season, 2002 NBA All-Star Game
  - Philippine Basketball Association 2002 season:
    - Purefoods TJ Hotdogs over the Alaska Aces 4–3 in the Governor's Cup Finals
    - Red Bull Thunder over the Talk 'N Text Phone Pals 4–3 in the Commissioner's Finals
    - Coca-Cola Tigers over the Alaska Aces 3–1 in the All-Filipino Cup Finals
  - Euroleague: Panathinaikos over Kinder Bologna 89–83 in the final match.
- Women
  - WNBA Finals: Los Angeles Sparks over the New York Liberty 2–0. MVP: Lisa Leslie
    - 2002 WNBA season, 2002 WNBA Playoffs, 2002 WNBA draft, 2002 WNBA All-Star Game

=== College ===
- Men
  - NCAA Division I: Maryland 64, Indiana 52
  - National Invitation Tournament: University of Memphis
  - NCAA Division II: Metropolitan State College of Denver 80, Kentucky Wesleyan College 72
  - NCAA Division III: Otterbein College 102, Elizabethtown College 83
  - NAIA Division I Oklahoma Science & Arts 96, Oklahoma Baptist University 79
  - NAIA Division II Evangel (Mo.) 84, Robert Morris (Ill.) 61
- Women
  - NCAA Division I: University of Connecticut 82, Oklahoma 70
  - Women's National Invitation Tournament: University of Oregon
  - NCAA Division II: Cal Poly Pomona 74, Southeastern Oklahoma 62
  - NCAA Division III Wis.-Stevens Point 67, St. Lawrence 65
  - NAIA Division I: Oklahoma City 82, Southern Nazarene (Okla.) 73
  - NAIA Division II Hastings (Neb.) 73, Cornerstone (Mich.) 69

== Awards and honors ==
=== Professional ===
- Men
  - NBA Most Valuable Player Award: Tim Duncan
  - NBA Rookie of the Year Award: Pau Gasol
  - NBA Defensive Player of the Year Award: Ben Wallace
  - NBA Coach of the Year Award: Rick Carlisle, Detroit Pistons
  - Euroscar Award: Dirk Nowitzki, Dallas Mavericks and Germany
  - Mr. Europa: Peja Stojaković, Sacramento Kings and Serbia and Montenegro
- Women
  - WNBA Most Valuable Player Award: Sheryl Swoopes, Houston Comets
  - WNBA Defensive Player of the Year Award: Sheryl Swoopes, Houston Comets
  - WNBA Rookie of the Year Award: Tamika Catchings, Indiana Fever
  - WNBA Most Improved Player Award: Coco Miller, Washington Mystics
  - Kim Perrot Sportsmanship Award: Jennifer Gillom, Phoenix Mercury
  - WNBA Coach of the Year Award: Marianne Stanley, Washington Mystics
  - WNBA All-Star Game MVP: Lisa Leslie, Los Angeles Sparks
  - WNBA Finals Most Valuable Player Award: Lisa Leslie, Los Angeles Sparks

=== Collegiate ===
- Combined
  - Legends of Coaching Award: Denny Crum, Louisville
- Men
  - John R. Wooden Award: Jay Williams, Duke
  - Naismith College Coach of the Year: Ben Howland, Pittsburgh
  - Frances Pomeroy Naismith Award: Steve Logan, Cincinnati
  - Associated Press College Basketball Player of the Year: Jay Williams, Duke
  - NCAA basketball tournament Most Outstanding Player: Carmelo Anthony, Syracuse
  - USBWA National Freshman of the Year: T. J. Ford, Texas
  - Associated Press College Basketball Coach of the Year: Ben Howland, Pittsburgh
  - Naismith Outstanding Contribution to Basketball: Don Haskins
- Women
  - Naismith College Player of the Year: Sue Bird, Connecticut
  - Naismith College Coach of the Year: Geno Auriemma, Connecticut
  - Wade Trophy: Sue Bird, Connecticut
  - Frances Pomeroy Naismith Award: Sheila Lambert, Baylor
  - Associated Press Women's College Basketball Player of the Year: Sue Bird, Connecticut
  - NCAA basketball tournament Most Outstanding Player: Swin Cash, UConn
  - Basketball Academic All-America Team: Stacey Dales-Schuman, Oklahoma
  - Carol Eckman Award: Barbara Stevens, Bentley College
  - Associated Press College Basketball Coach of the Year: Brenda Oldfield, Minnesota
  - List of Senior CLASS Award women's basketball winners: Sue Bird, Connecticut
  - Nancy Lieberman Award: Sue Bird, Connecticut
  - Naismith Outstanding Contribution to Basketball: Billie Moore

=== Naismith Memorial Basketball Hall of Fame ===
- Class of 2002:
  - Harlem Globetrotters
  - Larry Brown
  - Earvin "Magic" Johnson
  - Robert "Lute" Olson
  - Drazen Petrovic
  - Sandra Kay Yow

=== Women's Basketball Hall of Fame ===
- Class of 2002

- Cindy Brogdon
- Hortência Marcari
- Kamie Ethridge
- Margaret Sexton Gleaves
- Sandra Meadows
- Lea Plarski
- Marianne Crawford Stanley
- Tara VanDerveer

== Movies ==
- Double Teamed
- Juwanna Mann
- Like Mike

== Deaths ==
- January 6 — Fred Taylor, Hall of Fame coach of the 1960 National Champion Ohio State Buckeyes (born 1924)
- January 7 — Geoff Crompton, American NBA player (born 1955)
- January 18 — Alex Hannum, Hall of Fame pro basketball coach (born 1923)
- January 26 — Milt Ticco, American NBL player (born 1922)
- February 2 — Ed Jucker, American college coach (Cincinnati) (born 1916)
- February 13 — Bob Gerber, American NBL player (born 1916)
- February 21 — Gene Sullivan, American college coach (Loyola (Illinois)) (born 1931)
- March 11 — Al Bonniwell, American NBL player (Akron Firestone Non-Skids) (born 1911)
- March 18 — Don Betourne, American NBL player and coach (Kankakee Gallagher Trojans) (born 1915)
- May 5 — Jimmy Smith, American college All-American (Steubenville) (born 1934)
- June 3 — Cecil Hankins, NBA player (St. Louis Bombers, Boston Celtics) (born 1922)
- June 22 — Bobby Roberts, American college coach (Clemson).
- July 7 — Bison Dele, NBA player (born 1969)
- July 17 — Ubiratan Pereira Maciel, Hall of Fame Brazilian basketball player (born 1944)
- July 27 — Billy McCann, 82, American college coach (Hampden–Sydney, Washington and Lee, Virginia).
- August 8 — Chick Hearn, television and radio announcer for the Los Angeles Lakers (born 1916)
- September 2 — Abe Lemons, American college coach (Oklahoma City, Texas) (born 1922)
- September 7 — Edward Spotovich, American NBL player (born 1916)
- September 14 — Jim Barnes, Former #1 overall NBA draft pick and 1964 Olympic Gold medalist (born 1941)
- September 23 — Jule Rivlin, American NBL player (Akron Goodyear Wingfoots, Toledo Jeeps) and college coach (Marshall) (born 1917)
- December 17 — Bobby Joe Hill, American college national champion at Texas Western (1966) (born 1943)
- December 17 — Hank Luisetti, college basketball player and inventor of the layup; first player to score 50 points in a game (born 1916)
