= 2002 National Invitation Tournament =

University basketball tournament in the United States

- Season: 2001–02
- Teams: 40
- Finals site: Madison Square Garden, New York City
- Champions: Memphis Tigers (1st title)
- Runner-up: South Carolina Gamecocks (1st title game)
- Semifinalists: Temple Owls (4th semifinal); Syracuse Orangemen (2nd semifinal)
- Winning coach: John Calipari (1st title)
- MVP: Dajuan Wagner (Memphis)

The 2002 National Invitation Tournament was the 2002 edition of the annual NCAA college basketball competition.

== Selected teams ==
Below is a list of the 40 teams selected for the tournament.

School	Conference	Record	Appearance	Last bid
Arizona State	Pac-10	14–14	8th	2000
Ball State	MAC	20–11	4th	1998
Bowling Green	MAC	24–8	13th	2000
Butler	Horizon	25–5	7th	1999
BYU	Mountain West	17–11	9th	2000
Dayton	Atlantic 10	20–10	20th	2001
Detroit	Horizon	18–12	8th	1999
Fresno State	WAC	19–14	6th	2001
George Mason	Colonial	19–9	2nd	1986
Georgia State	A-Sun	20–10	1st	Never
Houston	C-USA	18–14	7th	1993
Iowa	Big Ten	19–15	3rd	1998
Louisiana-Lafayette	Sun Belt	20–10	4th	1985
Louisiana Tech	WAC	20–9	5th	1992
Louisville	C-USA	18–12	13th	1985
LSU	SEC	18–14	4th	1983
Manhattan	MAAC	20–8	17th	1996
Memphis	C-USA	22–9	15th	2001
Minnesota	Big Ten	17–12	10th	2001
Montana State	Big Sky	19–9	2nd	1987
New Mexico	Mountain West	16–13	16th	2001
Princeton	Ivy	16–11	5th	2000
Richmond	Atlantic 10	19–13	6th	2001
Rutgers	Big East	18–12	12th	2000
Saint Joseph's	Atlantic 10	18–11	7th	1996
South Carolina	SEC	18–14	8th	2001
South Florida	C-USA	19–12	7th	2000
St. Bonaventure	Atlantic 10	17–12	15th	2001
Syracuse	Big East	20–11	10th	1997
Temple	Atlantic 10	15–14	13th	1989
Tennessee Tech	Ohio Valley	24–6	2nd	1985
UC Irvine	Big West	21–10	4th	2001
UNC Greensboro	Southern	20–10	1st	Never
UNLV	Mountain West	20–10	6th	1999
Utah State	Big West	23–7	6th	1995
Vanderbilt	SEC	16–14	9th	2000
Villanova	Big East	17–12	15th	2001
Virginia	ACC	17–11	9th	2000
Wagner	Northeast	19–9	2nd	1979
Yale	Ivy	20–10	1st	Never

=== Georgetown declines invitation ===
Big East Conference member Georgetown originally was among the teams selected, but declined to take part. Hoyas head coach Craig Esherick explained that Georgetown's home court, the MCI Center in Washington, D.C., was booked to host the East Regional of the 2002 NCAA Division I men's basketball tournament, meaning that accepting the NIT invitation would have required the Hoyas to play on the road in the West for two weeks, forcing his players to miss many of their classes. After playing a similar schedule the previous season during the 2001 NCAA tournament, Esherick had concluded that missing so many classes to play in the NIT, a tournament which did not offer a chance for a national championship, was not in the best interest of Georgetown's players.

Esherick's controversial decision meant that Georgetown had no postseason play for the first time since the 1973–74 season. Georgetown became the first team to turn down an NIT bid since Louisville turned down a bid to the 1987 NIT.

== Bracket ==
Below are the four first-round brackets, along with the four-team championship bracket.

Opening Round
Richmond	74
Wagner	67
Montana State	77
Utah State	69

First Round
Syracuse	76
St. Bonaventure	66
Butler	81
Bowling Green	69
Minnesota	96
New Mexico	62
Richmond	63
Montana State	48

Second Round
Syracuse	66
Butler	65
Minnesota	66
Richmond	67

Quarterfinals
Syracuse	62
Richmond	46

Opening Round
Ball State	98
South Florida	92
Saint Joseph's	73
George Mason	64

First Round
Ball State	75
Saint Joseph's	65
LSU	63
Iowa	61
UNLV	96
Arizona State	91
South Carolina	74
Virginia	67

Second Round
Ball State	75
LSU	65
UNLV	65
South Carolina	75

Quarterfinals
Ball State	47
South Carolina	82

Opening Round
Louisiana Tech	83
Louisiana–Lafayette	63
Vanderbilt	59
Houston	50

First Round
Temple	81
Fresno State	75
Louisville	66
Princeton	65
Villanova	84
Manhattan	69
Louisiana Tech	83
Vanderbilt	68

Second Round
Temple	65
Louisville	62
Villanova	67
Louisiana Tech	64

Quarterfinals
Temple	63
Villanova	57

Opening Round
Tennessee Tech	64
Georgia State	62
Dayton	80
Detroit	69

First Round
Tennessee Tech	68
Dayton	59
Yale	67
Rutgers	65
BYU	78
UC Irvine	55
Memphis	82
UNC Greensboro	62

Second Round
Tennessee Tech	80
Yale	61
BYU	69
Memphis	80

Quarterfinals
Tennessee Tech	73
Memphis	79

=== Semifinals & finals ===
Semifinals
Syracuse	59
South Carolina	66
Temple	77
Memphis	78

Finals
South Carolina	62
Memphis	72

Third place game
Syracuse	54
Temple	65

== See also ==
- 2002 Women's National Invitation Tournament
- 2002 NCAA Division I men's basketball tournament
- 2002 NCAA Division II men's basketball tournament
- 2002 NCAA Division III men's basketball tournament
- 2002 NCAA Division I women's basketball tournament
- 2002 NAIA Division I men's basketball tournament
- 2002 NAIA Division II men's basketball tournament
