= 2001–02 Miami Hurricanes men's basketball team =

American college basketball season

2001–02 Miami Hurricanes men's basketball

NCAA tournament, First round
- Conference: Big East Conference

Ranking
- AP: No. 21
- Record: 24–8 (10–6 Big East)
- Head coach: Perry Clark (2nd season)
- Assistant coach: Dwight Freeman
- Home arena: Miami Arena

2001–02 Big East men's basketball standings
| | Conf. | | | | Overall |
| Team | W | | L | PCT | W | | L | PCT |
|---|---|---|---|---|---|---|---|---|
East
| No. 10 Connecticut† | 13 | – | 3 | .813 | 27 | – | 7 | .794 |
| No. 21 Miami | 10 | – | 6 | .625 | 24 | – | 8 | .750 |
| Boston College | 8 | – | 8 | .500 | 20 | – | 12 | .625 |
| Villanova | 7 | – | 9 | .438 | 19 | – | 13 | .594 |
| Providence | 6 | – | 10 | .375 | 15 | – | 16 | .484 |
| Virginia Tech* | 4 | – | 12 | .250 | 10 | – | 18 | .357 |
| St. John's# | 0 | – | 7 | .000 | 7 | – | 11 | .389 |
West
| No. 9 Pittsburgh | 13 | – | 3 | .813 | 29 | – | 6 | .829 |
| Notre Dame | 10 | – | 6 | .625 | 22 | – | 11 | .667 |
| Georgetown | 9 | – | 7 | .563 | 19 | – | 11 | .633 |
| Syracuse | 9 | – | 7 | .563 | 23 | – | 13 | .639 |
| Rutgers | 8 | – | 8 | .500 | 18 | – | 13 | .581 |
| Seton Hall | 5 | – | 11 | .313 | 12 | – | 18 | .400 |
| West Virginia* | 1 | – | 15 | .063 | 8 | – | 20 | .286 |
† 2002 Big East tournament winner As of April 1, 2002; Rankings from AP Poll; *Did not qualify for 2002 Big East tournament. #St. John's had 14 regular-season games vacated due to sanctions against the program; the school′s disputed record was 9–7, 20–12.

The 2001–02 Miami Hurricanes men's basketball team represented the University of Miami during the 2001–02 NCAA Division I men's basketball season.

The University of Miami men's basketball team, led by second-year head coach Perry Clark, played their home games at the Miami Arena as members of the Big East Conference. They finished the season 24–8, 10–6 in Big East play to finish in a tie for second place. They lost in the semifinals of the Big East tournament to Pittsburgh, but received an at-large invitation to the NCAA tournament as No. 5 seed in the West region. Miami was upset by No. 12 seed Missouri, 93–80.

== Roster ==
2001–02 Miami Hurricanes men's basketball team
Players
Coaches

| Pos. | # | Name | Height | Weight | Year | Hometown |
|---|---|---|---|---|---|---|
| G/F | 00 | Leroy Hurd | 6 ft 7 in (2.01 m) | 205 lb (93 kg) | Jr | Moss Point, MS |
| G/F | 3 | Michael Simmons | 6 ft 0 in (1.83 m) | 185 lb (84 kg) | Sr | Los Angeles, CA |
| G | 13 | Paulo Coelho | 6 ft 2 in (1.88 m) | 185 lb (84 kg) | Sr | Figueira da Foz, Portugal |
| F | 33 | James Jones | 6 ft 8 in (2.03 m) | 211 lb (96 kg) | Jr | Hialeah, FL |
| G | 45 | John Salmons | 6 ft 7 in (2.01 m) | 200 lb (91 kg) | Sr | Philadelphia, PA |

Head coach

- Leonard Hamilton (UT Martin)

Assistant coach(es)

- Dwight Freeman (Western Colorado)
- Stan Jones (Memphis)
- Scott Howard (Iowa State)

Legend

- (C) Team captain
- (S) Suspended
- (I) Ineligible
- (W) Walk-on
- Injured
- Current redshirt

== Schedule ==
| Date time, TV | Rank^{#} | Opponent^{#} | Result | Record | Site (attendance) city, state |
Non-conference regular season
| Nov 26, 2001* | | Florida Atlantic | W 74–48 | 5–0 | Miami Arena; Miami, Florida |
| Dec 15, 2001* | | vs. No. 21 Indiana; Orange Bowl Basketball Classic | W 58–53 | 9–0 | American Airlines Arena; Miami, Florida |
Big East regular season
| Jan 2, 2002 | No. 21 | at No. 24 Georgetown | W 79–71 | 14–0 (1–0) | Verizon Center; Washington, D.C. |
| Jan 5, 2002 | No. 21 | at Connecticut | L 75–76 | 14–1 (1–1) | Harry A. Gampel Pavilion; Storrs, Connecticut |
| Feb 26, 2002 | No. 22 | at Providence | W 81–65 | 22–6 (9–6) | Dunkin Donuts Center; Providence, Rhode Island |
| Mar 2, 2002 | No. 22 | Virginia Tech | W 83–77 | 23–6 (10–6) | Miami Arena; Miami, Florida |
Big East tournament
| Mar 7, 2002* | No. 20 | vs. Georgetown; Quarterfinals | W 84–76 ^{OT} | 24–6 | Madison Square Garden; New York, New York |
| Mar 8, 2002* | No. 20 | vs. No. 7 Pittsburgh; Semifinals | L 71–76 | 24–7 | Madison Square Garden; New York, New York |
NCAA tournament
| Mar 14, 2002* | (5 W) No. 21 | vs. (12 W) Missouri; First round | L 80–93 | 24–8 | University Arena; Albuquerque, New Mexico |
*Non-conference game. ^{#}Rankings from AP poll. (#) Tournament seedings in parentheses. W=West. All times are in Eastern Time.
