= 2001–02 Boston College Eagles men's basketball team =

American college basketball season

2001–02 Boston College Eagles men's basketball

NCAA tournament, first round
- Conference: Big East Conference
- Record: 20–12 (8–8 Big East)
- Head coach: Al Skinner (5th season)
- Assistant coaches: Bill Coen (5th season); Ed Cooley (5th season); Pat Duquette (5th season)
- Home arena: Silvio O. Conte Forum

2001–02 Big East men's basketball standings
| | Conf. | | | | Overall |
| Team | W | | L | PCT | W | | L | PCT |
|---|---|---|---|---|---|---|---|---|
East
| No. 10 Connecticut† | 13 | – | 3 | .813 | 27 | – | 7 | .794 |
| No. 21 Miami | 10 | – | 6 | .625 | 24 | – | 8 | .750 |
| Boston College | 8 | – | 8 | .500 | 20 | – | 12 | .625 |
| Villanova | 7 | – | 9 | .438 | 19 | – | 13 | .594 |
| Providence | 6 | – | 10 | .375 | 15 | – | 16 | .484 |
| Virginia Tech* | 4 | – | 12 | .250 | 10 | – | 18 | .357 |
| St. John's# | 0 | – | 7 | .000 | 7 | – | 11 | .389 |
West
| No. 9 Pittsburgh | 13 | – | 3 | .813 | 29 | – | 6 | .829 |
| Notre Dame | 10 | – | 6 | .625 | 22 | – | 11 | .667 |
| Georgetown | 9 | – | 7 | .563 | 19 | – | 11 | .633 |
| Syracuse | 9 | – | 7 | .563 | 23 | – | 13 | .639 |
| Rutgers | 8 | – | 8 | .500 | 18 | – | 13 | .581 |
| Seton Hall | 5 | – | 11 | .313 | 12 | – | 18 | .400 |
| West Virginia* | 1 | – | 15 | .063 | 8 | – | 20 | .286 |
† 2002 Big East tournament winner As of April 1, 2002; Rankings from AP Poll; *Did not qualify for 2002 Big East tournament. #St. John's had 14 regular-season games vacated due to sanctions against the program; the school′s disputed record was 9–7, 20–12.

The 2001–02 Boston College Eagles men's basketball team represented Boston College as a member of the Big East Conference during the 2001–02 NCAA Division I men's basketball season. Led by head coach Al Skinner, they played their home games at Conte Forum in Chestnut Hill, Massachusetts. The team finished fourth in the East division of the Big East regular season standings, lost in the semifinals of the Big East tournament, and received an at-large bid to the NCAA tournament. Playing as the No. 11 seed in the Midwest region, the Eagles were beaten by No. 6 seed Texas in the opening round. Boston College finished the season with a 20–12 (8–8 Big East) record.

== Roster ==
2001–02 Boston College Eagles men's basketball team
Players
Coaches

| Pos. | # | Name | Height | Weight | Year | Hometown |
|---|---|---|---|---|---|---|
| G | 2 | Troy Bell | 6 ft 1 in (1.85 m) | 175 lb (79 kg) | Jr | Minneapolis, Minnesota |
| G | 5 | Ryan Sidney | 6 ft 2 in (1.88 m) | 205 lb (93 kg) | So | Ann Arbor, Michigan |
| F | 0 | Uka Agbai | 6 ft 8 in (2.03 m) | 262 lb (119 kg) | Jr | Queens Village, Queens |
| G | 21 | Kenny Walls | 6 ft 5 in (1.96 m) | 194 lb (88 kg) | Sr | San Francisco, California |
| F | 45 | Brian Ross | 7 ft 8 in (2.34 m) | 240 lb (109 kg) | Sr | North Quincy, Massachusetts |
| G | 13 | Ludmil Hadjisotirov | 6 ft 2 in (1.88 m) | 202 lb (92 kg) | So | Sofia |
| G | 40 | Adam DeMong | 6 ft 2 in (1.88 m) | 180 lb (82 kg) | Jr | Glen Ellyn, Illinois |
| F | 34 | Andrew Bryant | 6 ft 7 in (2.01 m) | 232 lb (105 kg) | So | Denison, Texas |
| G | 4 | Jermaine Watson | 6 ft 3 in (1.91 m) | 205 lb (93 kg) | Fr | Dorchester, Boston |
| C | 13 | Nate Doornekamp | 7 ft 0 in (2.13 m) | 260 lb (118 kg) | Fr | Odessa, Ontario |
| C | 12 | Kirsten Zoellner | 7 ft 1 in (2.16 m) | 280 lb (127 kg) | Fr | Hanover, Lower Saxony |
| G | 41 | Mike Viglione (W) | 6 ft 2 in (1.88 m) | — | Fr | Northfield, Illinois |

Head coach

- Al Skinner

Assistant coach(es)

- Bill Coen
- Ed Cooley
- Pat Duquette

Legend

- (C) Team captain
- (S) Suspended
- (I) Ineligible
- (W) Walk-on
- Injured
- Current redshirt

== Schedule and results ==
| Date time, TV | Rank^{#} | Opponent^{#} | Result | Record | Site city, state |
Regular season
| Dec 1, 2001* | No. 15 | at Michigan | W 83–74 | 5–0 | Crisler Arena; Ann Arbor, Michigan |
| Dec 11, 2001* | No. 11 | Iowa State | W 86–81 | 8–0 | Silvio O. Conte Forum; Chestnut Hill, Massachusetts |
| Dec 16, 2001* | No. 11 | Holy Cross | W 75–51 | 9–0 | Silvio O. Conte Forum; Chestnut Hill, Massachusetts |
| Dec 20, 2001* | No. 10 | vs. Miami (OH); Rainbow Classic | L 67–73 | 9–1 | Stan Sheriff Center; Honolulu, Hawaii |
| Dec 21, 2001* | No. 10 | vs. Arkansas State; Rainbow Classic | W 76–70 | 10–1 | Stan Sheriff Center; Honolulu, Hawaii |
| Dec 22, 2001* | No. 10 | vs. Holy Cross; Rainbow Classic | W 67–57 | 11–1 | Stan Sheriff Center; Honolulu, Hawaii |
Big East tournament
| Mar 6, 2002* | | vs. Rutgers; Quarterfinals | W 60–55 | 20–10 | Madison Square Garden; New York, New York |
| Mar 7, 2002* | | vs. No. 7 Pittsburgh; Semifinals | L 62–76 | 20–11 | Madison Square Garden; New York, New York |
NCAA Tournament
| Mar 15, 2002* | (11 MW) | vs. (6 MW) Texas; First Round | L 57–70 | 20–12 | American Airlines Center; Dallas, Texas |
*Non-conference game. ^{#}Rankings from AP poll. (#) Tournament seedings in parentheses. MW=Midwest.
