= 2001–02 Notre Dame Fighting Irish men's basketball team =

American college basketball season

2001–02 Notre Dame Fighting Irish men's basketball

NCAA tournament, second round
- Conference: Big East Conference
- Record: 22–11 (10–6 Big East)
- Head coach: Mike Brey (2nd season)
- Assistant coach: Anthony Solomon (2nd season)
- Home arena: Joyce Center

2001–02 Big East men's basketball standings
	Conf.				Overall
Team	W		L	PCT	W		L	PCT
East
No. 10 Connecticut†	13	–	3	.813	27	–	7	.794
No. 21 Miami	10	–	6	.625	24	–	8	.750
Boston College	8	–	8	.500	20	–	12	.625
Villanova	7	–	9	.438	19	–	13	.594
Providence	6	–	10	.375	15	–	16	.484
Virginia Tech*	4	–	12	.250	10	–	18	.357
St. John's#	0	–	7	.000	7	–	11	.389
West
No. 9 Pittsburgh	13	–	3	.813	29	–	6	.829
Notre Dame	10	–	6	.625	22	–	11	.667
Georgetown	9	–	7	.563	19	–	11	.633
Syracuse	9	–	7	.563	23	–	13	.639
Rutgers	8	–	8	.500	18	–	13	.581
Seton Hall	5	–	11	.313	12	–	18	.400
West Virginia*	1	–	15	.063	8	–	20	.286
† 2002 Big East tournament winner As of April 1, 2002; Rankings from AP Poll; *Did not qualify for 2002 Big East tournament. #St. John's had 14 regular-season games vacated due to sanctions against the program; the school′s disputed record was 9–7, 20–12.

The 2001–02 Notre Dame Fighting Irish men's basketball team represented the University of Notre Dame during the 2001–02 NCAA Division I men's basketball season. As a 8 seed, the Fighting Irish defeated the 9 seed Charlotte in the first round, 82–63. Notre Dame would fall to Duke in the second round.

== Schedule ==
Date time, TV	Rank^{#}	Opponent^{#}	Result	Record	Site city, state
Regular season
November 16*		New Hampshire	W 95–53	1–0	Joyce Center; Notre Dame, IN
November 19*		Cornell	W 78–48	2–0	Joyce Center; Notre Dame, IN
November 23*		vs. Hawaii Pacific	W 98–58	3–0	Neal S. Blaisdell Center; Honolulu, Hawaii
November 24*		vs. Chattanooga	W 97–84	4–0	Neal S. Blaisdell Center; Honolulu, Hawaii
November 25*		vs. Monmouth	W 85–48	5–0	Neal S. Blaisdell Center; Honolulu, Hawaii
November 28*		Army	W 86–49	6–0	Notre Dame Fieldhouse; Notre Dame, IN
December 1*		vs. DePaul	W 82–55	7–0	United Center; Chicago, Illinois
December 4*		at Indiana	L 75–76	7–1	Assembly Hall; Bloomington, Indiana
December 8*		at Miami (OH)	W 70–69	8–1	Millett Hall; Oxford, Ohio
December 22*		at Canisius	W 84–73	9–1	Koessler Athletic Center; Buffalo, NY
December 27*		vs. Alabama	L 76–79	9–2	New Orleans Arena; New Orleans, Louisiana
December 30*		Colgate	W 92–61	10–2	Notre Dame Fieldhouse; Notre Dame, IN
January 2		Villanova	L 72–74	10–3 (0–1)	Notre Dame Fieldhouse; Notre Dame, IN
January 9		at West Virginia	W 67–64	11–3 (1–1)	WVU Coliseum; Morgantown, WV
January 12		at Pittsburgh	W 56–53	12–3 (2–1)	Fitzgerald Field House; Pittsburgh, Pennsylvania
January 14		at Syracuse	L 51–56	12–4 (2–2)	Carrier Dome; Syracuse, NY
January 19*; CBS		Kentucky	L 65–72	12–5 (2–2)	Joyce Center; South Bend, IN
January 21		Georgetown	L 73–83	12–6 (2–3)	Notre Dame Fieldhouse; South Bend, IN
January 26		Seton Hall	W 60–51	13–6 (3–3)	Notre Dame Fieldhouse; South Bend, IN
January 30		Pittsburgh	W 89–76	14–6 (4–3)	Notre Dame Fieldhouse; South Bend, IN
February 3		at Seton Hall	W 63–61	15–6 (5–3)	Izod Center; East Rutherford, NJ
February 6		Rutgers	W 89–72	15–6 (6–3)	Notre Dame Fieldhouse; South Bend, IN
February 9		at Georgetown	W 116–111 ^{4OT}	16–6 (7–3)	Verizon Center; Washington, D.C.
February 14		at Rutgers	L 62–65	17–7 (7–4)	Louis Brown Athletic Center; Piscataway, NJ
February 17		Syracuse	L 65–68	17–8 (7–5)	Joyce Center; South Bend, IN
February 20		West Virginia	W 89–76	18–8 (8–5)	Joyce Center; South Bend, IN
February 23		at Miami (FL)	W 90–77	19–8 (9–5)	Miami Arena; Miami, Florida
February 27		at St. John's	L 81–84	19–9 (9–6)	Madison Square Garden; New York, New York
March 2 CBS		Providence	W 76–68	20–9 (10–6)	Joyce Center; South Bend, IN
Big East tournament
March 7		vs. St. John's; Quarterfinal	W 83–63	21–9	Madison Square Garden; New York, New York
March 8		vs. Connecticut; Semifinal	L 77–82	21–10	Madison Square Garden; New York, New York
NCAA tournament
March 14*; CBS		vs. Charlotte; First Round	W 82–63	22–10	BI-LO Center; Greenville, SC
March 16*; CBS		vs. Duke; Second Round	L 77–84	22–11	BI-LO Center; Greenville, SC
*Non-conference game. ^{#}Rankings from AP poll. (#) Tournament seedings in parentheses.
