= 2001–02 Pittsburgh Panthers men's basketball team =

American college basketball season

2001–02 Pittsburgh Panthers men's basketball

Big East Regular Season West Champions

NCAA tournament, Sweet Sixteen
- Conference: Big East Conference

Ranking
- Coaches: No. 9
- AP: No. 9
- Record: 29–6 (13–3 Big East)
- Head coach: Ben Howland (3rd season)
- Assistant coaches: Jamie Dixon (3rd season); Barry Rohrssen (1st season); Ernie Zeigler (1st season)
- Home arena: Fitzgerald Field House (Capacity: 4,122)

2001–02 Big East men's basketball standings
	Conf.				Overall
Team	W		L	PCT	W		L	PCT
East
No. 10 Connecticut†	13	–	3	.813	27	–	7	.794
No. 21 Miami	10	–	6	.625	24	–	8	.750
Boston College	8	–	8	.500	20	–	12	.625
Villanova	7	–	9	.438	19	–	13	.594
Providence	6	–	10	.375	15	–	16	.484
Virginia Tech*	4	–	12	.250	10	–	18	.357
St. John's#	0	–	7	.000	7	–	11	.389
West
No. 9 Pittsburgh	13	–	3	.813	29	–	6	.829
Notre Dame	10	–	6	.625	22	–	11	.667
Georgetown	9	–	7	.563	19	–	11	.633
Syracuse	9	–	7	.563	23	–	13	.639
Rutgers	8	–	8	.500	18	–	13	.581
Seton Hall	5	–	11	.313	12	–	18	.400
West Virginia*	1	–	15	.063	8	–	20	.286
† 2002 Big East tournament winner As of April 1, 2002; Rankings from AP Poll; *Did not qualify for 2002 Big East tournament. #St. John's had 14 regular-season games vacated due to sanctions against the program; the school′s disputed record was 9–7, 20–12.

The 2001–02 Pittsburgh Panthers men's basketball team represented the University of Pittsburgh in the 2001–02 NCAA Division I men's basketball season. Led by head coach Ben Howland, the Panthers finished with a record of 29–6. They received an at-large bid to the 2002 NCAA Division I men's basketball tournament where they lost in the Sweet Sixteen to Kent State.
