= 2001–02 Georgetown Hoyas men's basketball team =

American college basketball season

2001–02 Georgetown Hoyas men's basketball

Declined invitation to National Invitation Tournament
- Conference: Big East
- West Division
- Record: 19–11 (9–7 Big East)
- Head coach: Craig Esherick (4th season)
- Assistant coaches: Mike Riley (20th season); Ronny Thompson (4th season); Chip Simms (3rd season)
- Captains: Kevin Braswell; Courtland Freeman; Ryan Growney (manager)
- Home arena: MCI Center

2001–02 Big East men's basketball standings
	Conf.				Overall
Team	W		L	PCT	W		L	PCT
East
No. 10 Connecticut†	13	–	3	.813	27	–	7	.794
No. 21 Miami	10	–	6	.625	24	–	8	.750
Boston College	8	–	8	.500	20	–	12	.625
Villanova	7	–	9	.438	19	–	13	.594
Providence	6	–	10	.375	15	–	16	.484
Virginia Tech*	4	–	12	.250	10	–	18	.357
St. John's#	0	–	7	.000	7	–	11	.389
West
No. 9 Pittsburgh	13	–	3	.813	29	–	6	.829
Notre Dame	10	–	6	.625	22	–	11	.667
Georgetown	9	–	7	.563	19	–	11	.633
Syracuse	9	–	7	.563	23	–	13	.639
Rutgers	8	–	8	.500	18	–	13	.581
Seton Hall	5	–	11	.313	12	–	18	.400
West Virginia*	1	–	15	.063	8	–	20	.286
† 2002 Big East tournament winner As of April 1, 2002; Rankings from AP Poll; *Did not qualify for 2002 Big East tournament. #St. John's had 14 regular-season games vacated due to sanctions against the program; the school′s disputed record was 9–7, 20–12.

The 2001–02 Georgetown Hoyas men's basketball team represented Georgetown University in the 2001–02 NCAA Division I college basketball season. The Hoyas were coached by Craig Esherick and played most of their home games at the MCI Center in Washington, DC, although they played some home games early in the season at McDonough Gymnasium on the Georgetown campus. The Hoyas were members of the West Division of the Big East Conference. They finished the season 19–11, 9–7 in Big East play. They advanced to the quarterfinals of the 2002 Big East men's basketball tournament before losing to Miami in overtime. Missing an at-large bid to the 2002 NCAA Men's Division I Basketball Tournament, Georgetown instead received an invitation to play in the 2002 National Invitation Tournament (NIT), but declined it and had no postseason play, the first Georgetown men's basketball team since the 1973–74 season to appear in neither the NCAA Tournament or the NIT.

== Season recap ==
Georgetown entered the season anticipating that sophomore power forward Mike Sweetney, freshman forward Harvey Thomas, and junior center Wesley Wilson would make up an imposing frontcourt. Thomas, who averaged 5.2 points and 2.5 rebounds a game, and Wilson, who averaged 12.2 points and 6.2 rebounds, played inconsistently all season, but Sweetney remained as dominant as he had been the previous season. He improved his free-throw shooting from 61% the previous year to 79% this season, that change alone accounting for an average of an additional 2.7 points per game. He had 14 double-doubles, including 26 points and 13 rebounds against Rutgers in January 2002. He would complete the season averaging 19.0 points and 10.0 rebounds a game, the first Georgetown player to average at least 15 points and 10 rebounds a game since Alonzo Mourning.

Senior point guard and team co-captain Kevin Braswell was a leader of the team, starting all 30 games and completing his string of starting all 128 games of his collegiate career. Inconsistent play dogged him during the year as it had throughout his career, however; he shot over 50 percent from the field in only one Big East game during the season and finished the year shooting only 37 percent from the field in conference play.

Sophomore forward Gerald Riley started all 30 games – as he would all 125 games of his collegiate career – and improved his play in many ways from that of his freshman year. His average minutes played per game increased from 17 to 27, and his average points per game increased from 6.7 to 10.3. He shot 81.3 percent from the free-throw line, and in 13 games made every free throw he attempted. He had a 21-point game against West Virginia and scored 18 points against Syracuse.

The team opened the season 9–1, but went 9–9 the rest of the way. Its record stood at 14–7 overall, 5–4 in the Big East, when Notre Dame came to the MCI Center for a conference game on February 9, 2002. In the first half, Georgetown focused on getting the ball inside to Sweetney, who had 18 first-half points, and Wilson, who scored 10 in the first half, and as a team scored 35 points inside during the half. Notre Dame, meanwhile, emphasized rebounding and accurate shooting, shooting almost 60 percent from the field in the first half, and opened a 12-point lead. The Hoyas made a 7–0 run to end the half and trailed 48–43 at halftime. In the second half, Georgetown continued to close the gap until tying the score at 61–61 with 13:24 to play. Notre Dame then made a 7–0 run of its own to lead 68–61, but Georgetown closed to a four-point deficit with eight minutes to play, to one point behind on a three pointer by freshman guard Drew Hall (who shot 3-for-3 from beyond the three-point line during the game), and tied the game again on a free throw with 7:29 to play. Over the rest of regulation, both teams played tough defense and shot a combined 3-for-20 (15.0%) from the field. Georgetown had an 84–82 lead when Notre Dame junior guard Matt Carroll sank a two-pointer to tie the score. When the Hoyas managed to stop a late Notre Dame rally, the game went into overtime.

In overtime, Notre Dame built a lead, Georgetown caught up, the Fighting Irish took a lead again in the last two minutes, but the Hoyas surged back to tie the game. With 17 seconds left and Georgetown holding the ball for the final shot, Braswell brought the ball down the court, and instead of passing, chose to take a long shot that missed. The second overtime played out the same way, with Notre Dame taking the lead, Georgetown coming back, and Notre Dame again gaining the advantage with under two minutes left. The Hoyas again tied the game and held the ball for the last shot, and Braswell again had the ball; this time he ignored chances to pass the ball inside to Sweetney and to freshman guard Tony Bethel and instead took a low-percentage 30-foot (9.1-meter) shot that missed. The pattern repeated itself in the third overtime; Notre Dame led, Georgetown closed, the Fighting Irish got the lead back in the final two minutes, and the Hoyas came back to tie and had the ball for the last shot. Notre Dame senior forward Ryan Humphrey blocked Gerald Riley's shot, deflecting it to Braswell, who launched a 20-foot (6.1-meter) shot that went through the basket just after the shot clock expired with less than seven-tenths of a second left to play.

By the fourth overtime, Wilson had fouled out, junior center-forward and team co-captain Courtland Freeman had been injured, and Riley and Braswell soon also fouled out – Braswell leaving having shot only 5-for-19 (26.3%) from the field and 0-for-4 at three-point range, part of a slump in which he shot 2-for-17 (11.8%) in three-point attempts over a four-game stretch. The final blow to the tiring Hoyas came when Sweetney fouled out after a 35-point, 20-rebound performance, leaving Georgetown with only one of its starting five players still available to play. Notre Dame, with its starters still on the floor, finally pulled away in the last minute to win, 116–111. The 60 minutes of play over the course of regulation and four overtimes had seen the two teams combined take 190 shots, grab 108 rebounds, and take 72 free throw shots, all while committing only 13 turnovers each. The loss dropped Georgetown to 14–8 overall and 5–5 in the Big East, and in retrospect was a turning point in the Esherick era at Georgetown; in the previous 100 games, Esherick's teams had posted a 64-36 (.640) record, but after the loss the Hoyas went 37-33 (.529) under Esherick, who departed after the end of the 2003-04 season.

A week later, Sweetney shot 11-for-15 (73.4%) from the field and scored 31 points at Villanova, but the rest of the team shot only 11-for-57 (19.3%) from the field as the Hoyas lost another overtime game, 83–72. After losing to Connecticut three days later, the Hoyas embarked on a four-game winning streak in which Sweetney averaged 16 points and 11.5 rebounds. Braswell, meanwhile, scored in double figures in nine straight games to end the season and had a school-record 16 assists against Rutgers in the regular-season home finale, and he finished the year averaging 14.4 points per game for the season and 13.5 points per game for his career.

Georgetown finished the regular season with a three-game winning streak, posting a record of 18–10 overall, 9–7 in the Big East, and finishing tied for third place in the conference's West Division. In the 2002 Big East tournament, the Hoyas beat Providence in the first round to stretch their winning streak to four games and raise hopes that they had an outside chance of receiving an invitation to the 2002 NCAA tournament. However, they lost in the quarterfinals to Miami in overtime despite Gerald Riley's 15-point performance, knocking them out of the Big East tournament and out of consideration for an NCAA bid.

With no NCAA bid, Georgetown instead received an invitation to play in the 2002 National Invitation Tournament (NIT), but Esherick declined it. He explained his controversial decision by saying that Georgetown's home court, the MCI Center, was booked to host the East Regional of the 2002 NCAA Tournament, meaning that accepting the NIT invitation would have required the Hoyas to play on the road in the West for two weeks, forcing his players to miss many of their classes. After playing a similar schedule the previous season during the 2001 NCAA tournament, Esherick had concluded that missing so many classes to play in the NCAA Tournament would have been worth it because of the chance to win a national championship, but that missing them to play in the NIT, a tournament which did not offer a chance for a national championship, was not in the best interest of Georgetown's players. Georgetown became only the second team in history to turn down an NIT bid, and the first to do so since Louisville turned down an invitation to the 1987 NIT.

The 2001–02 team had a frustrating year, losing all three overtime games it played and three other games by only one point, and on five occasions it entered the final minute of a Big East game with a lead and lost. Esherick's decision to turn down the NIT bid made it the first Georgetown men's basketball team since the 1973–74 season to appear in neither the NCAA Tournament or the NIT.

== Roster ==
#	Name	Height	Weight (lbs.)	Position	Class	Hometown	Previous Team(s)
2	Courtland Freeman	6'9"	228	F/C	Jr.	Myrtle Beach, SC, U.S.	Socastee HS
3	Omari Faulkner	6'6"	205	F	So.	Memphis, TN, U.S.	Hamilton HS
5	Drew Hall	6'2"	185	G	Fr.	Silver Spring, MD, U.S.	Montrose Christian School
11	Trenton Hillier	5'9"	165	G	Jr.	Chagrin Falls, OH, U.S.	Kenston HS
12	Kevin Braswell	6'2"	190	G	Sr.	Baltimore, MD, U.S.	Lake Clifton HS
13	Victor Samnick	6'8"	208	F	Sr.	Douala, Cameroon	Newport Prep (Md)
15	Harvey Thomas	6'8"	205	F	Fr.	Fredericksburg, VA, U.S.	Hamilton HS (Memphis, TN)
22	Tony Bethel	6'1"	185	G	Fr.	Fort Washington, MD, U.S.	Montrose Christian School
25	Glennard Johnson	6'4"	220	F	Sr.	Washington, DC, U.S.	St. Albans School; University of Virginia
32	Gerald Riley	6'6"	217	G	So.	Milledgeville, GA, U.S.	Baldwin HS
34	Mike Sweetney	6'8"	260	F/C	So.	Oxon Hill, MD, U.S.	Oxon Hill HS
50	Wesley Wilson	6'11"	235	C	Jr.	Vallejo, CA, U.S.	Maine Central Institute

== Rankings ==
Ranking movement Legend: ██ Improvement in ranking. ██ Decrease in ranking. ██ Not ranked the previous week. RV=Others receiving votes.
Poll	Pre	Wk 1	Wk 2	Wk 3	Wk 4	Wk 5	Wk 6	Wk 7	Wk 8	Wk 9	Wk 10	Wk 11	Wk 12	Wk 13	Wk 14	Wk 15	Wk 16	Final	Post
AP	14	16	18	19	18	16	20	24											– (Note: No Associated Press Poll this week.)
Coaches (Note: Sources confirm that Georgetown was not ranked in the final or postseason Coaches' Poll, but Coaches' Poll rankings from the rest of the season are not available.)	N/A	N/A	N/A	N/A	N/A	N/A	N/A	N/A	N/A	N/A	N/A	N/A	N/A	N/A	N/A	N/A	N/A		

== 2001–02 Schedule and results ==
- All times are Eastern

Date time, TV	Rank^{#}	Opponent^{#}	Result	Record	Site (attendance) city, state
Preseason
Sat., Nov. 3, 2001; 7:30 p.m., none		Fort Hood (U.S. Army All-Star Team)	W 108–65	exhibition	McDonough Gymnasium (N/A); Washington, DC
Thu., Nov. 8, 2001; 7:30 p.m., none		New Zealand Select Team	W 87–53	exhibition	McDonough Gymnasium (N/A); Washington, DC
Regular season
Fri., Nov. 16, 2001*; 7:30 p.m., none	No. 14	Marymount	W 108–47	1–0	McDonough Gymnasium (3,179); Washington, DC
Mon., Nov. 19, 2001*; 7:00 p.m., ESPN	No. 14	vs. Georgia; Hall of Fame Tip Off Classic	L 59–73	1–1	Springfield Civic Center (7,246); Springfield, MA
Wed., Nov. 21, 2001*; 7:00pm, none	No. 16	Coastal Carolina	W 76–51	2–1	McDonough Gymnasium (2,215); Washington, DC
Sat., Nov. 24, 2001*; 7:00pm, none	No. 16	Towson; John Thompson Classic	W 91–40	3–1	MCI Center (2,692); Washington, DC
Mon., Nov. 26, 2001*; 7:30pm, none	No. 16	Grambling State	W 103–69	4–1	MCI Center (5,077); Washington, DC
Wed., Nov. 28, 2001*; 7:30pm, none	No. 18	Bethune-Cookman	W 91–61	5–1	McDonough Gymnasium (1,865); Washington, DC
Thu., Dec. 6, 2001*; 7:00pm, ESPN	No. 19	at South Carolina	W 70–68	6–1	Carolina Coliseum (10,023); Columbia, SC
Mon., Dec. 10, 2001*; 7:30pm, none	No. 19	Morgan State	W 91–65	7–1	MCI Center (7,201); Washington, DC
Sat., Dec. 15, 2001*; 1:00pm, none	No. 18	Norfolk State	W 87–68	8–1	MCI Center (7,118); Washington, DC
Mon., Dec. 17, 2001*; 7:30pm, none	No. 18	Howard	W 99–80	9–1	MCI Center (5,089); Washington, DC
Thu., Dec. 20, 2001*; 8:00pm, TBS	No. 16	No. 5 Virginia; John Thompson Classic	L 55–61	9–2	MCI Center (18,789); Washington, DC
Sat., Dec. 29, 2001*; 4:00pm, CBS	No. 20	at No. 15 UCLA	L 91–98	9–3	Pauley Pavilion (10,423); Los Angeles, CA
Wed., Jan. 2, 2002; 6:00pm, none	No. 24	No. 21 Miami	L 71–79	9–4 (0–1)	MCI Center (6,589); Washington, DC
Sat., Jan. 5, 2002; 7:00pm, ESPN2	No. 24	at Rutgers	L 87–89 ^{OT}	9–5 (0–2)	Louis Brown Athletic Center (8,134); Piscataway, NJ
Sat., Jan. 12, 2002; 1:00pm, CBS		at No. 16 Boston College	W 70–43	10–5 (1–2)	Silvio O. Conte Forum (8,606); Chestnut Hill, MA
Wed., Jan. 16, 2002; 7:30pm, none		Seton Hall	W 84–58	11–5 (2–2)	MCI Center (7,589); Washington, DC
Sat., Jan. 19, 2002; 12:00 noon, none		Pittsburgh	L 67–68	11–6 (2–3)	MCI Center (8,589); Washington, DC
Mon., Jan. 21, 2002; 7:00pm, ESPN		at Notre Dame	W 83–73	12–6 (3–3)	Edmund P. Joyce Center (11,102); Notre Dame, IN
Sat., Jan. 26, 2002; 4:00pm, none		at Pittsburgh	L 56–57	12−7 (3–4)	Fitzgerald Field House (6,798); Pittsburgh, PA
Mon., Jan. 28, 2002; 7:00pm, ESPN		No. 14 Syracuse; Rivalry	W 75–60	13–7 (4–4)	MCI Center (14,889); Washington, DC
Sat., Feb. 2, 2002; 12:00 noon, none		West Virginia	W 85–77	14–7 (5–4)	MCI Center (11,279); Washington, DC
Sat., Feb. 9, 2002; 12:00 noon, none		Notre Dame	L 111–116 ^{4OT}	14–8 (5–5)	MCI Center (14,698); Washington, DC
Tue., Feb. 12, 2002; 8:00pm, ESPN2		at Seton Hall	W 84–77	15–8 (6–5)	Continental Airlines Arena (8,624); East Rutherford, NJ
Sat., Feb. 16, 2002; 12:00 noon, none		at Villanova	L 72–83 ^{OT}	15–9 (6–6)	First Union Center (14,527); Philadelphia, PA
Tue., Feb. 19, 2002; 7:30pm, ESPN2		Connecticut; Rivalry	L 74–75	15–10 (6–7)	MCI Center (11,223); Washington, DC
Sun., Feb. 24, 2002; 2:00pm, CBS		at Syracuse; Rivalry	W 75–69	16–10 (7–7)	Carrier Dome (29,215); Syracuse, NY
Wed., Feb. 27, 2002; 7:00pm, none		at West Virginia	W 87–77	17–10 (8–7)	WVU Coliseum (4,279); Morgantown, WV
Sat., Mar. 2, 2002; 12:00 noon, none		Rutgers	W 88–69	18–10 (9–7)	MCI Center (11,223); Washington, DC
Big East tournament
Wed., Mar. 6, 2002; 2:00pm, ESPN/ESPN2		vs. Providence; First Round	W 68–67	19–10	Madison Square Garden (17,741); New York, NY
Wed., Mar. 7, 2002; 2:00pm, ESPN/ESPN2		vs. No. 20 Miami; Quarterfinal	L 76–84	19–11	Madison Square Garden (19,012); New York, NY
National Invitation Tournament
Declined invitation
*Non-conference game. ^{#}Rankings from AP Poll. (#) Tournament seedings in parentheses.
