= 2002 NCAA Division II women's basketball tournament =

- Teams: 48
- Finals site: Mayo Civic Center, Rochester, Minnesota
- Champions: Cal Poly Pomona Broncos (5th title)
- Runner-up: Southeastern Oklahoma Savages (1st title game)
- Semifinalists: Glenville State Pioneers (1st Final Four); South Dakota State Jackrabbits (1st Final Four)
- Winning coach: Paul Thomas (2nd title)
- MOP: Lauri McIntosh (Cal Poly Pomona)

The 2002 NCAA Division II women's basketball tournament was the 21st annual tournament hosted by the NCAA to determine the national champion of Division II women's collegiate basketball in the United States.

Defending champions Cal Poly Pomona defeated Southeastern Oklahoma State in the championship game, 74–62, to claim the Broncos' fifth overall and second consecutive NCAA Division II national title.

As in 2001, the championship rounds were contested at the Mayo Civic Center in Rochester, Minnesota.

This was the first tournament since 1990 not to feature one of North Dakota or North Dakota State in the national championship game.

== Regionals ==
=== East - Glenville, West Virginia ===
Location: Jesse Lilly Gym Host: Glenville State College

First round Round of 48; March 7
5 | Belmont Abbey | 70
4 | Millersville | 84
6 | Shippensburg | 72
3 | West Liberty State | 82*

Regional semifinals Round of 32; March 8
1 | Glenville State | 49
4 | Millersville | 42
3 | West Liberty State | 49
2 | California (PA) | 76

Regional finals Sweet 16; March 9
1 | Glenville State | 78
2 | California (PA) | 58

=== Great Lakes - Evansville, Indiana ===
Location: Physical Activities Center Host: University of Southern Indiana

First round Round of 48; March 7
5 | Gannon | 59
4 | Hillsdale | 77
3 | Northern Kentucky | 73
6 | Northern Michigan | 60

Regional semifinals Round of 32; March 8
1 | Southern Indiana | 84
4 | Hillsdale | 63
3 | Northern Kentucky | 71
2 | Lake Superior State | 62

Regional finals Sweet 16; March 9
1 | Southern Indiana | 66
3 | Northern Kentucky | 69

=== North Central - Grand Junction, Colorado ===
Location: Brownson Arena Host: Mesa State College

First round Round of 48; March 8
5 | Regis | 76
4 | South Dakota State | 91
3 | Nebraska–Kearney | 57
6 | SW Minnesota State | 67

Regional semifinals Round of 32; March 9
1 | Mesa State | 63
4 | South Dakota State | 76
6 | SW Minnesota State | 66
2 | North Dakota | 57

Regional finals Sweet 16; March 10
4 | South Dakota State | 62
6 | SW Minnesota State | 50

=== Northeast - Springfield, Massachusetts ===
Location: Henry A. Butova Gym Host: American International College

First round Round of 48; March 8
4 | Assumption | 59
5 | Pace | 67
6 | Bentley | 65
3 | Le Moyne | 54

Regional semifinals Round of 32; March 9
1 | American International | 57
5 | Pace | 53
3 | Bentley | 50
2 | Adelphi | 58

Regional finals Sweet 16; March 10
1 | American International | 61
2 | Adelphi | 57

=== South - Cleveland, Mississippi ===
Location: Walter Sillers Coliseum Host: Delta State University

First round Round of 48; March 7
4 | Central Arkansas | 68*
5 | West Alabama | 65
3 | Arkansas Tech | 68
6 | Fort Valley State | 64

Regional semifinals Round of 32; March 8
1 | Delta State | 89
4 | Central Arkansas | 98
3 | Arkansas Tech | 57
2 | Florida Tech | 61

Regional finals Sweet 16; March 9
4 | Central Arkansas | 64
2 | Florida Tech | 71

=== South Atlantic - Mars Hill, North Carolina ===
Location: Stanford Arena Host: Mars Hill College

First round Round of 48; March 7
4 | Presbyterian | 56
5 | Virginia State | 65
6 | Georgia College | 62
3 | North Carolina Central | 74

Regional semifinals Round of 32; March 8
1 | Mars Hill | 79
5 | Virginia State | 68
3 | North Carolina Central | 79
2 | USC Aiken | 62

Regional finals Sweet 16; March 9
1 | Mars Hill | 69
3 | North Carolina Central | 64

=== South Central - St. Joseph, Missouri ===
Location: MWSC Fieldhouse Host: Missouri Western State College

First round Round of 48; March 7
4 | SE Oklahoma State | 63
5 | Washburn | 50
6 | Angelo State | 73
3 | Cameron | 80

Regional semifinals Round of 32; March 8
1 | Missouri Western State | 76
4 | SE Oklahoma State | 81
3 | Cameron | 61
2 | St. Mary's (TX) | 64

Regional finals Sweet 16; March 9
4 | SE Oklahoma State | 76
2 | St. Mary's (TX) | 70

=== West - Pomona, California ===
Location: Kellogg Gym Host: California State Polytechnic University, Pomona

First round Round of 48; March 7
4 | Cal State Bakersfield | 96
5 | Seattle Pacific | 84
3 | Montana State Billings | 55
6 | Sonoma State | 67

Regional semifinals Round of 32; March 8
1 | Cal Poly Pomona | 65
4 | Cal State Bakersfield | 61
6 | Sonoma State | 60
2 | Western Washington | 71

Regional finals Sweet 16; March 9
1 | Cal Poly Pomona | 71
2 | Western Washington | 70

== Elite Eight - Rochester, Minnesota ==
Location: Mayo Civic Center Host: Winona State University

National quarterfinals Elite Eight; March 20
W | Cal Poly Pomona | 88
SA | Mars Hill | 69
NC | South Dakota State | 68
GL | Northern Kentucky | 67
E | Glenville State | 94**
NE | American International | 86
SC | SE Oklahoma State | 84
S | Florida Tech | 68

National semifinals Final Four; March 21
W | Cal Poly Pomona | 74
NC | South Dakota State | 62
E | Glenville State | 67
SC | SE Oklahoma State | 77

National championship March 23
W | Cal Poly Pomona | 74
SC | SE Oklahoma State | 62

== All-tournament team ==
- Lauri McIntosh, Cal Poly Pomona
- Aprile Powell, Cal Poly Pomona
- Brandi Robinson, Southeastern Oklahoma
- Amanda Mortlette, Glenville State
- Tracy Wyatt, Glenville State

== See also ==
- 2002 NCAA Division I women's basketball tournament
- 2002 NCAA Division III women's basketball tournament
- 2002 NAIA Division I women's basketball tournament
- 2002 NAIA Division II women's basketball tournament
- 2002 NCAA Division II men's basketball tournament
