= 2001–02 St. John's Red Storm men's basketball team =

American college basketball season

2001–02 St. John's Red Storm men's basketball

NCAA Tournament, First Round (vacated)
- Conference: Big East Conference (1979–2013)
- Record: 7–11 (13 wins 1 loss vacated) (0–7 (9 wins vacated) Big East)
- Head coach: Mike Jarvis (4th year)
- Assistant coaches: Kevin Clark; Mike Jarvis II; Dermon Player
- Home arena: Alumni Hall; Madison Square Garden

2001–02 Big East men's basketball standings
| | Conf. | | | | Overall |
| Team | W | | L | PCT | W | | L | PCT |
|---|---|---|---|---|---|---|---|---|
East
| No. 10 Connecticut† | 13 | – | 3 | .813 | 27 | – | 7 | .794 |
| No. 21 Miami | 10 | – | 6 | .625 | 24 | – | 8 | .750 |
| Boston College | 8 | – | 8 | .500 | 20 | – | 12 | .625 |
| Villanova | 7 | – | 9 | .438 | 19 | – | 13 | .594 |
| Providence | 6 | – | 10 | .375 | 15 | – | 16 | .484 |
| Virginia Tech* | 4 | – | 12 | .250 | 10 | – | 18 | .357 |
| St. John's# | 0 | – | 7 | .000 | 7 | – | 11 | .389 |
West
| No. 9 Pittsburgh | 13 | – | 3 | .813 | 29 | – | 6 | .829 |
| Notre Dame | 10 | – | 6 | .625 | 22 | – | 11 | .667 |
| Georgetown | 9 | – | 7 | .563 | 19 | – | 11 | .633 |
| Syracuse | 9 | – | 7 | .563 | 23 | – | 13 | .639 |
| Rutgers | 8 | – | 8 | .500 | 18 | – | 13 | .581 |
| Seton Hall | 5 | – | 11 | .313 | 12 | – | 18 | .400 |
| West Virginia* | 1 | – | 15 | .063 | 8 | – | 20 | .286 |
† 2002 Big East tournament winner As of April 1, 2002; Rankings from AP Poll; *Did not qualify for 2002 Big East tournament. #St. John's had 14 regular-season games vacated due to sanctions against the program; the school′s disputed record was 9–7, 20–12.

The 2001–02 St. John's Red Storm men's basketball team represented St. John's University during the 2001–02 NCAA Division I men's basketball season. The team was coached by Mike Jarvis in his fourth year. St. John's home games are played at Carnesecca Arena, then called Alumni Hall, and Madison Square Garden and the team is a member of the Big East Conference.

== Off season ==
=== Departures ===
| Name | Number | Pos. | Height | Weight | Year | Hometown | Notes |
|---|---|---|---|---|---|---|---|
| Omar Cook | 10 | PG | 6'1" | 190 | Freshman | Brooklyn, New York | Entered 2001 NBA draft |
| Reggie Jessie | 41 | SF | 6'7" | | Senior | Queens, New York | Graduated |
| Jack Wolfinger | 32 | C | 6'11" | | Sophomore | Redding, Connecticut | Transferred to Ventura College |
| John Parker | 55 | G | 6'6" | | Sophomore | Pasadena, California | Transferred |

=== Class of 2001 signees ===
College recruiting information
| Name | Hometown | School | Height | Weight | Commit date |
|---|---|---|---|---|---|
| Marcus Hatten; PG | Baltimore, MD | Tallahassee Community College | 6 ft 1 in (1.85 m) | N/A | |
| Marcus Hatten; PG | Recruit ratings: No ratings found | | | | |
| Tristan Smith; PG | Amityville, NY | Amityville Memorial High School | 6 ft 1 in (1.85 m) | N/A | |
| Tristan Smith; PG | Recruit ratings: No ratings found | | | | |
| Eric King; SF | Brooklyn, NY | Abraham Lincoln/Milford Academy | 6 ft 6 in (1.98 m) | N/A | |
| Eric King; SF | Recruit ratings: No ratings found | | | | |
Overall recruit ranking:
Note: In many cases, Scout, Rivals, 247Sports, On3, and ESPN may conflict in their listings of height and weight.; In these cases, the average was taken. ESPN grades are on a 100-point scale.; Sources: "2001 Team Ranking". Rivals.

== Roster ==
2001–02 St. John's Red Storm men's basketball team
Players
Coaches

| Pos. | # | Name | Height | Weight | Year | Previous school | Hometown |
|---|---|---|---|---|---|---|---|
| G | 1 | Marcus Hatten | 6 ft 1 in (1.85 m) | 165 lb (75 kg) | Jr | Mergenthaler/Tallahassee | Baltimore, MD |
| G | 2 | Tristan Smith | 6 ft 1 in (1.85 m) | 180 lb (82 kg) | Fr | Amityville Memorial | Amityville, NY |
| G | 3 | Sharif Fordham | 6 ft 4 in (1.93 m) | 190 lb (86 kg) | Sr | Milford Academy/Gulf Coast | Far Rockaway, NY |
| C | 4 | Abe Keita | 6 ft 11 in (2.11 m) | 216 lb (98 kg) | Jr | Winchendon | Tolland, CT |
| G | 11 | Jon Scheiman (W) | 6 ft 1 in (1.85 m) | 180 lb (82 kg) | Jr | LaGuardia | Manhattan, NY |
| G | 14 | Andre Stanley (W) | 6 ft 4 in (1.93 m) | 215 lb (98 kg) | Jr | Globe Institute/John Jay | Brooklyn, NY |
| G | 15 | Alpha Bangura | 6 ft 6 in (1.98 m) | 213 lb (97 kg) | RS Jr | Eleanor Roosevelt/Monmouth | Lanham, MD |
| F | 22 | Anthony Glover | 6 ft 6 in (1.98 m) | 225 lb (102 kg) | Sr | Rice | Bronx, NY |
| G/F | 23 | Willie Shaw | 6 ft 6 in (1.98 m) | 190 lb (86 kg) | So | Kennedy | Mount Vernon, NY |
| F | 25 | Kyle Cuffe | 6 ft 9 in (2.06 m) | 236 lb (107 kg) | So | Rice | Bronx, NY |
| F/C | 33 | Donald Emanuel | 6 ft 9 in (2.06 m) | 249 lb (113 kg) | Sr | Jones | Houston, TX |
| F | 34 | Eric King | 6 ft 6 in (1.98 m) | 220 lb (100 kg) | Fr | Lincoln/Milford Academy | Brooklyn, NY |
| C | 44 | Mohamed Diakite | 6 ft 11 in (2.11 m) | 210 lb (95 kg) | So | Montrose Christian | Rockville, MD |
| C | 52 | Curtis Johnson | 7 ft 3 in (2.21 m) | 320 lb (145 kg) | So | Ryan Academy | Norfolk, VA |
| G | 55 | Danny Bovain (W) | 6 ft 3 in (1.91 m) | 173 lb (78 kg) | Jr | Columbus | Bronx, NY |

Head coach

- Mike Jarvis (Northeastern)

Assistant coach(es)

- Kevin Clark
- Mike Jarvis II
- Dermon Player

Legend

- (C) Team captain
- (S) Suspended
- (I) Ineligible
- (W) Walk-on
- Injured
- Current redshirt

Roster
Last update: May 27, 2020

== Schedule and results ==
| Date time, TV | Rank^{#} | Opponent^{#} | Result | Record | Site (attendance) city, state |
Exhibition
| 11/10/01*; 2:00pm | | Harlem Globetrotters | W 75-69 | | Madison Square Garden (12,398); New York, NY |
Regular Season
| 11/17/01*; 7:30pm | | Stony Brook | W 72-55 | 1-0 | Alumni Hall (6,008); Queens, NY |
| 11/22/01*; 12:00am, ESPN | | vs. Gonzaga; Great Alaska Shootout | L 58-65 | 1-1 | Sullivan Arena (7,601); Anchorage, AK |
| 11/23/01*; 2:00pm | | vs. Oregon State; Great Alaska Shootout | W 66-63 | 2-1 | Sullivan Arena (6,505); Anchorage, AK |
| 11/24/01*; 6:00pm | | vs. Tennessee; Great Alaska Shootout | W 69-55 | 3-1 | Sullivan Arena (6,528); Anchorage, AK |
| 12/27/01*; 7:30pm | | New York Panthers (Exp.) | W 87-74 | | Alumni Hall; Queens, NY |
| 12/01/01*; 2:30pm | | Fordham | W 76-67 | 4-1 | Madison Square Garden (8,803); New York, NY |
| 12/08/01*; 2:00pm | | at Manhattan | L 68-85 | 4-2 | Madison Square Garden (9,768); New York, NY |
| 12/11/01*; 7:30pm | | at Niagara | W 60-52 | 5-2 | Gallagher Center (2,046); Niagara, NY |
| 12/16/01*; 2:00pm | | Hofstra | W 89-79 | 6-2 | Alumni Hall (6,008); Queens, NY |
| 12/20/01*; 7:30pm | | St. Francis (N.Y.) | W 89-82 | 7-2 | Alumni Hall (6,008); Queens, NY |
| 12/22/01*; 12:00pm, ESPN | | No. 20 Wake Forest | W 72-60 | 8-2 | Madison Square Garden (12,072); New York, NY |
| 12/29/01*; 2:00pm | | Quinnipiac | W 97-60 | 9-2 | Alumni Hall (6,008); Queens, NY |
| 01/02/02; 7:30pm | | at Pittsburgh | L 54-77 | 9-3 (0-1) | Fitzgerald Field House (5,892); Pittsburgh, PA |
| 01/05/02; 2:00pm | | West Virginia | W 72-53 | 10-3 (1-1) | Madison Square Garden (8,659); New York, NY |
| 01/08/02; 7:30pm, ESPN2 | | No. 21 Miami (F.L.) | W 71-60 | 11-3 (2-1) | Alumni Hall (6,008); Queens, NY |
| 01/12/02; 12:00pm | | at Providence | L 57-78 | 11-4 (2-2) | Providence Civic Center (8,134); Providence, RI |
| 01/17/02; 7:00pm, ESPN | | at No. 22 Boston College | W 64-57 | 12-4 (3-2) | Silvio O. Conte Forum (7,523); Chestnut Hill, MA |
| 01/20/02; 2:00pm | | Villanova | W 65-63 | 13-4 (4-2) | Madison Square Garden (13,101); New York, NY |
| 01/23/02; 7:30pm | | at No. 25 Connecticut | L 70-75 | 13-5 (4-3) | Gampel Pavilion (10,027); Storrs, CT |
| 01/26/02; 9:00pm | | Providence | L 70-75 ^{OT} | 13-6 (4-4) | Madison Square Garden (9,683); New York, NY |
| 01/29/02; 7:30pm, ESPN2 | | at Seton Hall | L 61-63 ^{OT} | 13-7 (4-5) | Continental Airlines Arena (9,152); East Rutherford, NJ |
| 02/03/02; 2:00pm | | at Virginia Tech | W 72-63 | 14-7 (5-5) | Cassell Coliseum (3,215); Blacksburg, VA |
| 02/06/02*; 7:30pm | | Fairfield | W 95-56 | 15-7 (5-5) | Alumni Hall (N/A); Queens, NY |
| 02/09/02; 7:00pm, ESPN | | Connecticut | W 85-83 ^{OT} | 16-7 (6-5) | Madison Square Garden (19,580); New York, NY |
| 02/13/02; 7:30pm | | at Miami | L 56-79 | 16-8 (6-6) | Miami Arena (5,782); Miami, FL |
| 02/16/02; 4:00pm | | Virginia Tech | W 73-63 | 17-8 (7-6) | Alumni Hall (6,008); Queens, NY |
| 02/18/02; 7:00pm, ESPN | | Boston College | W 71-62 | 18-8 (8-6) | Madison Square Garden (N/A); New York, NY |
| 02/24/02*; 4:00pm, CBS | | at No. 3 Duke | L 55-97 | 18-9 (8-6) | Cameron Indoor Stadium (9,314); Durham, NC |
| 02/27/02; 7:30pm | | Notre Dame | W 84-81 | 19-9 (9-6) | Madison Square Garden (13,214); New York, NY |
| 03/03/02; 2:00pm | | at Villanova | L 62-77 | 19-10 (9-7) | The Pavilion (6,500); Villanova, PA |
Big East tournament
| 03/06/02; 9:00pm | | vs. Seton Hall; Big East tournament first round | W 64-58 | 20-10 (9-7) | Madison Square Garden (19,221); New York, NY |
| 03/07/02; 9:30pm | | vs. Notre Dame; Big East tournament Quarterfinal | L 63-83 | 20-11 (9-7) | Madison Square Garden (19,589); New York, NY |
NCAA tournament
| 03/15/02; 7:30pm, CBS | | vs. Wisconsin; NCAA First Round | L 70-80 | 20-12 (9-7) | MCI Center (N/A); Washington, D.C. |
*Non-conference game. ^{#}Rankings from AP Poll. (#) Tournament seedings in parentheses.
