= 2002 Big East men's basketball tournament =

- Classification: Division I
- Season: 2001–02
- Teams: 12
- Site: Madison Square Garden; New York City
- Champions: Connecticut (5th title)
- Winning coach: Jim Calhoun (5th title)
- MVP: Caron Butler (Connecticut)

2001–02 Big East men's basketball standings
	Conf.				Overall
Team	W		L	PCT	W		L	PCT
East
No. 10 Connecticut†	13	–	3	.813	27	–	7	.794
No. 21 Miami	10	–	6	.625	24	–	8	.750
Boston College	8	–	8	.500	20	–	12	.625
Villanova	7	–	9	.438	19	–	13	.594
Providence	6	–	10	.375	15	–	16	.484
Virginia Tech*	4	–	12	.250	10	–	18	.357
St. John's#	0	–	7	.000	7	–	11	.389
West
No. 9 Pittsburgh	13	–	3	.813	29	–	6	.829
Notre Dame	10	–	6	.625	22	–	11	.667
Georgetown	9	–	7	.563	19	–	11	.633
Syracuse	9	–	7	.563	23	–	13	.639
Rutgers	8	–	8	.500	18	–	13	.581
Seton Hall	5	–	11	.313	12	–	18	.400
West Virginia*	1	–	15	.063	8	–	20	.286
† 2002 Big East tournament winner As of April 1, 2002; Rankings from AP Poll; *Did not qualify for 2002 Big East tournament. #St. John's had 14 regular-season games vacated due to sanctions against the program; the school′s disputed record was 9–7, 20–12.

The 2002 Big East men's basketball tournament took place at Madison Square Garden in New York City. Its winner received the Big East Conference's automatic bid to the 2002 NCAA tournament. It is a single-elimination tournament with four rounds and the two highest seeds in each division received byes in the first round. The six teams with the best conference records in each division were invited to participate for a total of 12 teams. Teams were seeded by division. Connecticut and Pittsburgh had the best regular season conference records and received the East #1 seed and West #1 seed, respectively.

Connecticut defeated Pittsburgh in the championship game 74–65 in double overtime to win its fifth Big East tournament championship.

== Bracket ==
First round
W5	Rutgers	55
E4	Boston College	60
E6	Providence	67
W3	Georgetown	68
E5	Villanova	78
W4	Syracuse	64
W6	Seton Hall	58
E3	St. John's	64

Quarterfinals
W1	#7 Pittsburgh	76
E4	Boston College	62
E2	#20 Miami	84^{OT}
W3	Georgetown	76
E1	#19 Connecticut	72
E5	Villanova	70
W2	Notre Dame	82
E3	St John's	63

Semifinals
W1	#7 Pittsburgh	76
E2	#20 Miami	71
E1	#19 Connecticut	82
W2	Notre Dame	77

Championship game
W1	#7 Pittsburgh	65
E1	#19 Connecticut	74^{2OT}

Note: By finishing in last place during the regular season in their respective divisions, Virginia Tech and West Virginia did not qualify for the tournament.

== Championship game ==
ESPN

Saturday, March 9
8:00 pm

Box Score

E1 Connecticut Huskies 74, W1 Pittsburgh Panthers 65 (2OT)
Pts: C. Butler 23; Rebs: E. Okafor 10; Asts: T. Brown 5	Pts: O. Lett 17; Rebs: O. Lett 10; Asts: B. Knight 8 Halftime Score: Pittsburgh, 28-27; After Regulation: 52-52

Madison Square Garden - New York, NY
Attendance: 19,528
Referees: Jim Burr, Tim Higgins, Mike Kitts

Caron Butler, the tournament MVP, gave Connecticut the lead for good at 66–64 on a turnaround jumper with 1:59 left in the second overtime, and Pittsburgh fell to the Huskies in two overtimes, 74–65. After Ben Gordon was tied up with two seconds left on the shot clock, Taliek Brown put up a desperation heave from about thirty feet away with the shot clock running down to put the Huskies up 69–64, and they never looked back.

Brandin Knight had a chance to win it for Pittsburgh at the end of the first overtime. After slipping and injuring his right knee, just as they tied the game at 52, Knight was clearly in pain. However, with 1.7 seconds left in OT, he checked into the game and put up a 40-foot 3-point attempt that would have won the game. It bounced off the rim and the game went to double OT.

Knight's eight assists tied him at 229 for the school record in a season. He had fifteen points in the loss. Ontario Lett, who tied the game with 23 seconds left in overtime, had 17 in the loss.

Butler finished with 23 points for Uconn in the win, while Brown added 13. It was the fifth Big East tournament championship for the Huskies, their last coming in 1999, when they went on to win the national championship. It was their sixth title game appearance in the last eight years. The game was the second-longest title game in league history. Syracuse beat Villanova 83–80 in three overtimes in 1981.

== Awards ==
Dave Gavitt Trophy (Most Valuable Player): Caron Butler, Connecticut

All Tournament Team

- Marcus Barnes, Miami
- Caron Butler, Connecticut
- Ben Gordon, Connecticut
- Brandin Knight, Pittsburgh
- Ontario Lett, Pittsburgh
- Chris Thomas, Notre Dame
