= 2002 NCAA Division III women's basketball tournament =

- Teams: 64
- Finals site: Hulbert Arena, Terre Haute, Indiana
- Champions: Wisconsin–Stevens Point Pointers (2nd title)
- Runner-up: St. Lawrence Saints (1st title game)
- Third place: DePauw Tigers (1st Final Four)
- Fourth place: Marymount Saints (1st Final Four)
- Winning coach: Shirley Egner (1st title)
- MOP: Carry Boehning (Wisconsin–Stevens Point)
- Attendance: 26,401

The 2002 NCAA Division III women's basketball tournament was the 21st annual tournament hosted by the NCAA to determine the national champion of Division III women's collegiate basketball in the United States.

Wisconsin–Stevens Point defeated St. Lawrence in the championship game, 67–65, to claim the Pointers' second Division III national title and first since 1987.

The championship rounds were played at the Hulbert Arena in Terre Haute, Indiana, hosted by Rose–Hulman Institute of Technology.

== Bracket ==
=== Top left sectional ===
First round February 27, 2002; Campus sites
Bethany (WV)*	79
Benedictine (IL)	58
Anderson (IN)*	75
Thomas More	80
Maryville (TN)*	79
SCAD	66
Guilford*	54
Methodist	47

Second round March 2, 2002; Campus sites
Wilmington (OH)*	83
Bethany (WV)	66
Thomas More	76
Hope*	87
DePauw*	75
Maryville (TN)	58
Guilford	71
Hardin–Simmons*	72

Sectional semifinals March 8–9, 2002; Wilmington, OH
Wilmington (OH)	89
Hope	81
DePauw	84
Hardin–Simmons	60

Sectional finals March 8–9, 2002; Wilmington, OH
Wilmington (OH)	70
DePauw	88

=== Bottom left sectional ===
First round February 27, 2002; Campus sites
Eastern Connecticut*	62
Salem State	61
Southern Maine*	51
Emmanuel (MA)	63
Buffalo State*	61
Ohio Wesleyan	71
Mount Saint Mary*	56
Case Reserve	59

Second round March 2, 2002; Campus sites
Springfield*	61
Eastern Connecticut	50
Emmanuel (MA)	66
Bowdoin*	80
Ithaca*	67
Ohio Wesleyan	73
Case Reserve	67
St. Lawrence*	73

Sectional semifinals March 8–9, 2002; Springfield, MA
Springfield	50
Bowdoin	64
Ohio Wesleyan	56
St. Lawrence	57

Sectional finals March 8–9, 2002; Springfield, MA
Bowdoin	51
St. Lawrence	64

=== Top right sectional ===
First round February 27, 2002; Campus sites
Scranton*	71
Western Maryland	61
Alvernia*	62
Hunter	46
Salve Regina*	82
Kean	85
Christopher Newport*	71
Hood	40

Second round March 2, 2002; Campus sites
Messiah*	65
Scranton	70
Alvernia	61
King's (PA)*	79
Salisbury*	67
Kean	49
Christopher Newport	62
Marymount (VA)*	75

Sectional semifinals March 8–9, 2002; Salisbury, MD
Scranton	57
King's (PA)	72
Salisbury	52
Marymount (VA)	79

Sectional finals March 8–9, 2002; Salisbury, MD
King's (PA)	64
Marymount (VA)	67

=== Bottom right sectional ===
First round February 27, 2002; Campus sites
UW Stevens Point*	88
Lake Forest	52
Lakeland*	61
Millikin	54
Webster*	81
Aurora	60
Saint Benedict*	91
UW Stout	80
Carleton*	71
Wartburg	61
Chapman*	78
Pomona-Pitzer	65

Second round March 2, 2002; Campus sites
Washington St. Louis*	60
UW Stevens Point	66
Lakeland	33
Webster*	48
Pacific Lutheran*	60
Saint Benedict	54
Carleton	74
Chapman*	87

Sectional semifinals March 8–9, 2002; Stevens Point, WI
UW Stevens Point	71
Webster	61
Pacific Lutheran	62
Chapman	54

Sectional finals March 8–9, 2002; Stevens Point, WI
UW Stevens Point	64
Pacific Lutheran	47

=== Final Four ===
Final Four
DePauw	54
St. Lawrence	69
Marymount (VA)	57
UW Stevens Point	80

National championship
St. Lawrence	65
UW Stevens Point	67
Third place
DePauw	65
Marymount (VA)	58

== All-tournament team ==
- Carry Boehning, Wisconsin–Stevens Point
- Tara Schmitt, Wisconsin–Stevens Point
- Lindsey Rush, DePauw
- Megan Dietrichsen, St. Lawrence
- Cara Barbierri, St. Lawrence

== See also ==
- 2002 NCAA Division I women's basketball tournament
- 2002 NCAA Division II women's basketball tournament
- 2002 NAIA Division I women's basketball tournament
- 2002 NAIA Division II women's basketball tournament
- 2002 NCAA Division III men's basketball tournament
