= Preston Shumpert =

American-Turkish professional basketball player

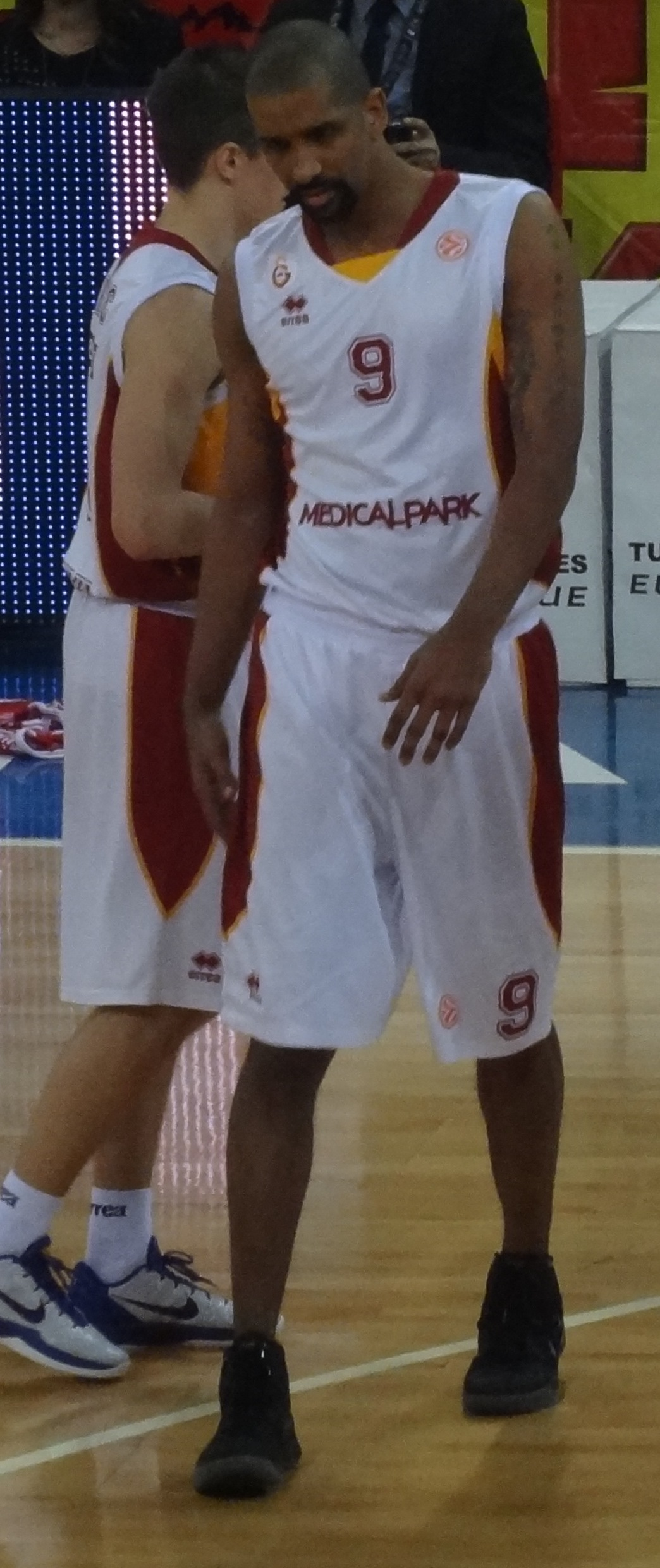

Personal information
- Born: August 20, 1979 (age 47) Muncie, Indiana, U.S.
- Listed height: 6 ft 6 in (1.98 m)
- Listed weight: 200 lb (91 kg)

Career information
- High school: Fort Walton Beach (Fort Walton Beach, Florida)
- College: Syracuse (1998–2002)
- NBA draft: 2002: undrafted
- Playing career: 2002–2013
- Position: Shooting guard / small forward

Career history
- 2002–2003: Besançon
- 2003–2004: Agricola Gloria
- 2004–2005: Villaggio Solidago Livorno
- 2005–2006: Armani Jeans Milano
- 2006: Climamio Bologna
- 2006–2007: Benetton Treviso
- 2007–2008: Beşiktaş Cola Turka
- 2008–2010: Efes Pilsen
- 2010–2012: Galatasaray
- 2012–2013: Aliağa Petkim

Preston Anthony Shumpert (20 August 1979), also known by his Turkish name of Mert Shumpert, is an American-born, naturalised-Turkish professional basketball player. He was twice named to the All-Big East first team while playing college basketball for Syracuse.

== College ==
Shumpert appeared in 32 games in his freshman year with averages of 5.4 points and 2.4 rebounds.

Shumpert earned the spot of sixth man in his sophomore year, and led the team in 3-point percentage with a 42.9 percent clip. He also made four starts, and averaged 10.4 points per game.

In his junior season, Shumpert became a full-time starter and blossomed as one of the most prolific scorers in the Big East. He averaged 19.5 points that season, and was named the Big East's Most Improved Player, and was also a first-team All Big East selection.

In the early part of his senior season, Shumpert fulfilled expectations, as Syracuse jumped up to a 14–2 record and a No. 10 overall ranking. Shumpert led the way, scoring 30 or more points on seven occasions, including a career high 37 against Albany. Shumpert finished with career averages of 14.2 points and 4.4 rebounds per game.

== Professional career ==
Undrafted by the NBA, Shumpert decided to go play overseas, first starting in France for the 2002–03 season, signed by Besançon BCD, in the French Pro-B. Following his stint in France, Shumpert has bounced around in the Italian professional leagues, including stints with Agricola Gloria M.T. (Serie A2, 2003–04), Villaggio Solidago Livorno (04–05), where he played in 2005 the Italian All Star Game, and Armani Jeans Milano (05–06).

He started the 2006–07 season with Climamio Bologna, before transferring in December to Benetton Treviso, starting 22 games and averaging 13.6 points, while helping them to the national cup. Shumpert came to Turkey to play for Beşiktaş Cola Turka in the 2007–08 season. After a very productive season in both Turkish league and ULEB Cup, he decided to follow coach Ergin Ataman and join Efes Pilsen. In August 2010 he signed with Galatasaray.
