= 2001–02 Connecticut Huskies men's basketball team =

American college basketball season

2001–02 Connecticut Huskies men's basketball

Big East tournament champions Big East East Division regular season champions

NCAA tournament, Elite Eight
- Conference: Big East Conference

Ranking
- Coaches: No. 6
- AP: No. 10
- Record: 27–7 (13–3 Big East)
- Head coach: Jim Calhoun (16th season)
- Assistant coaches: George Blaney; Dave Leitao; Tom Moore
- Home arena: Hartford Civic Center; Harry A. Gampel Pavilion

2001–02 Big East men's basketball standings
	Conf.				Overall
Team	W		L	PCT	W		L	PCT
East
No. 10 Connecticut†	13	–	3	.813	27	–	7	.794
No. 21 Miami	10	–	6	.625	24	–	8	.750
Boston College	8	–	8	.500	20	–	12	.625
Villanova	7	–	9	.438	19	–	13	.594
Providence	6	–	10	.375	15	–	16	.484
Virginia Tech*	4	–	12	.250	10	–	18	.357
St. John's#	0	–	7	.000	7	–	11	.389
West
No. 9 Pittsburgh	13	–	3	.813	29	–	6	.829
Notre Dame	10	–	6	.625	22	–	11	.667
Georgetown	9	–	7	.563	19	–	11	.633
Syracuse	9	–	7	.563	23	–	13	.639
Rutgers	8	–	8	.500	18	–	13	.581
Seton Hall	5	–	11	.313	12	–	18	.400
West Virginia*	1	–	15	.063	8	–	20	.286
† 2002 Big East tournament winner As of April 1, 2002; Rankings from AP Poll; *Did not qualify for 2002 Big East tournament. #St. John's had 14 regular-season games vacated due to sanctions against the program; the school′s disputed record was 9–7, 20–12.

The 2001–02 Connecticut Huskies men's basketball team represented the University of Connecticut in the 2001–02 collegiate men's basketball season. The Huskies completed the season with a 27–7 overall record. The Huskies were members of the Big East Conference where they finished with a 13–3 record, were the regular season champions, and were the 2002 Big East men's basketball tournament champions.

UConn made it to the Elite Eight of the 2002 NCAA Division I men's basketball tournament before losing to Maryland 90–82. The Huskies played their home games at Harry A. Gampel Pavilion in Storrs, Connecticut and the Hartford Civic Center in Hartford, Connecticut, and they were led by sixteenth-year head coach Jim Calhoun.

== Roster ==
Listed are the student athletes who were members of the 2001–2002 team.

Name	Position	Year
Justin Brown	C	JR
Taliek Brown	G	SO
Caron Butler	F	SO
Ben Gordon	G	FR
Kwasi Gyambibi	G	SR
Mike Hayes	F	JR
Scott Hazelton	F	FR
Chris McLaughlin	G	SR
Emeka Okafor	C	FR
Tony Robertson	G	JR
Johnnie Selvie	F	SR
Robert Swain	G	SO
Shamon Tooles	G	SO
Ace Watanasuparp		SO
Chad Wise	G	FR
Daryl Woods		SO
Mike Woodward	G	JR

== Schedule ==
Date time, TV	Rank^{#}	Opponent^{#}	Result	Record	Site (attendance) city, state
Exhibition
11/6/2001*		Nike Elite	W 105–77		Harry A. Gampel Pavilion; Storrs, CT
11/13/2001*		Grass Roots Canada	W 107–57		Hartford Civic Center; Hartford, CT
Regular Season
11/19/2001*; WTXX		Vanderbilt	W 84–71	1–0	Hartford Civic Center (15,904); Hartford, CT
11/26/2001*; WTXX		New Hampshire	W 110–58	2–0	Hartford Civic Center (15,935); Hartford, CT
12/2/2001*		vs. George Washington; BB&T Classic	W 84–76	3–0	MCI Center (13,860); Washington, D.C.
12/3/2001*		vs. No. 2 Maryland; BB&T Classic	L 65–77	3–1	MCI Center (14,813); Washington, D.C.
12/8/2001*; WTXX		Northeastern	W 80–44	4–1	Harry A. Gampel Pavilion (10,027); Storrs, CT
12/11/2001*; ESPN		at Massachusetts; MassMutual UGame	W 69–59	5–1	William D. Mullins Memorial Center (8,894); Amherst, MA
12/21/2001*; WTXX		Quinnipiac	W 95–79	6–1	Hartford Civic Center (15,857); Hartford, CT
12/28/2001*; WTXX		St. Bonaventure	L 70–88	6–2	Hartford Civic Center (16,294); Hartford, CT
1/2/2002; WTXX		at Virginia Tech	W 86–74	7–2 (1–0)	Cassell Coliseum (2,581); Blacksburg, VA
1/5/2002; WTXX		No. 21 Miami	W 76–75	8–2 (2–0)	Harry A. Gampel Pavilion (10,027); Storrs, CT
1/7/2002*; ESPN		No. 5 Oklahoma	L 67–69	8–3	Hartford Civic Center (16,294); Hartford, CT
1/10/2002; WTXX		Virginia Tech	W 95–60	9–3 (3–0)	Hartford Civic Center (16,294); Hartford, CT
1/13/2002; WTXX		at Villanova	W 70–65	10–3 (4–0)	First Union Center (12,027); Philadelphia, PA
1/16/2002; WTXX		at Providence	W 69–62	11–3 (5–0)	Dunkin' Donuts Center (12,143); Providence, RI
1/19/2002*; CBS		North Carolina	W 86–54	12–3	Harry A. Gampel Pavilion (10,027); Storrs, CT
1/23/2002; WTXX	No. 25	St. John's	W 75–70	13–3 (6–0)	Harry A. Gampel Pavilion (10,027); Storrs, CT
1/26/2002*; CBS	No. 25	at No. 10 Arizona	W 100–98 ^{OT}	14–3	McKale Center (14,577); Tucson, AZ
1/30/2002; WTXX	No. 17	at Rutgers	L 53–61	14–4 (6–1)	Louis Brown Athletic Center (7,526); Piscataway, NJ
2/2/2002; WTXX	No. 17	at No. 15 Miami	L 66–68	14–5 (6–2)	Miami Arena (10,135); Miami, FL
2/5/2002; ESPN2		Providence	W 67–56	15–5 (7–2)	Hartford Civic Center (16,294); Hartford, CT
2/9/2002; ESPN		at St. John's	L 83–85 ^{OT}	15–6 (7–3)	Madison Square Garden (19,580); New York, NY
2/11/2002; ESPN		Villanova	W 46–40	16–6 (8–3)	Hartford Civic Center (16,294); Hartford, CT
2/16/2002; WTXX		Boston College	W 79–77 ^{OT}	17–6 (9–3)	Hartford Civic Center (16,294); Hartford, CT
2/19/2002; ESPN2		at Georgetown; Rivalry	W 75–74	18–6 (10–3)	MCI Center (11,223); Washington, D.C.
2/23/2002; WTXX		West Virginia	W 95–73	19–6 (11–3)	Harry A. Gampel Pavilion (10,027); Storrs, CT
2/25/2002; ESPN	No. 23	at Boston College	W 75–61	20–6 (12–3)	Conte Forum (8,163); Boston, MA
3/2/2002; ESPN	No. 23	Seton Hall	W 90–78	21–6 (13–3)	Harry A. Gampel Pavilion (10,027); Storrs, CT
Big East tournament
3/7/2002; ESPN2	No. 19	vs. Villanova; Quarterfinals	W 72–70	22–6	Madison Square Garden (19,528); New York, NY
3/8/2002; ESPN	No. 19	vs. Notre Dame; Semifinals	W 82–77	23–6	Madison Square Garden (19,528); New York, NY
3/9/2002; ESPN	No. 19	vs. No. 7 Pittsburgh; Championship	W 74–65 ^{2OT}	24–6	Madison Square Garden (19,528); New York, NY
NCAA tournament
3/15/2002*; CBS	(2 E) No. 10	vs. (15 E) Hampton; First Round	W 78–67	25–6	MCI Center (17,725); Washington, D.C.
3/17/2002*; CBS	(2 E) No. 10	vs. (7 E) No. 25 NC State; Second Round	W 77–74	26–6	MCI Center (17,725); Washington, D.C.
3/22/2002*; CBS	(2 E) No. 10	vs. (11 E) Southern Illinois; Sweet Sixteen	W 71–59	27–6	Carrier Dome (29,252); Syracuse, NY
3/24/2002*; CBS	(2 E) No. 10	vs. (1 E) No. 4 Maryland; Elite Eight	L 82–90	27–7	Carrier Dome (29,252); Syracuse, NY
*Non-conference game. ^{#}Rankings from AP Poll. (#) Tournament seedings in parentheses. All times are in Eastern Time.

Schedule Source:
