= 2001–02 Syracuse Orangemen basketball team =

American college basketball season

2001–02 Syracuse Orangemen men's basketball

Preseason NIT champions

National Invitation Tournament, 4th Place
- Conference: Big East Conference
- Record: 23–13 (9–7 Big East)
- Head coach: Jim Boeheim (26th season)
- Assistant coaches: Bernie Fine (26th season); Mike Hopkins (7th season); Troy Weaver (2nd season)
- Home arena: Carrier Dome

2001–02 Big East men's basketball standings
	Conf.				Overall
Team	W		L	PCT	W		L	PCT
East
No. 10 Connecticut†	13	–	3	.813	27	–	7	.794
No. 21 Miami	10	–	6	.625	24	–	8	.750
Boston College	8	–	8	.500	20	–	12	.625
Villanova	7	–	9	.438	19	–	13	.594
Providence	6	–	10	.375	15	–	16	.484
Virginia Tech*	4	–	12	.250	10	–	18	.357
St. John's#	0	–	7	.000	7	–	11	.389
West
No. 9 Pittsburgh	13	–	3	.813	29	–	6	.829
Notre Dame	10	–	6	.625	22	–	11	.667
Georgetown	9	–	7	.563	19	–	11	.633
Syracuse	9	–	7	.563	23	–	13	.639
Rutgers	8	–	8	.500	18	–	13	.581
Seton Hall	5	–	11	.313	12	–	18	.400
West Virginia*	1	–	15	.063	8	–	20	.286
† 2002 Big East tournament winner As of April 1, 2002; Rankings from AP Poll; *Did not qualify for 2002 Big East tournament. #St. John's had 14 regular-season games vacated due to sanctions against the program; the school′s disputed record was 9–7, 20–12.

The 2001–02 Syracuse Orangemen basketball team represented Syracuse University in NCAA men's basketball competition in the 2001–02 Division I season. The head coach was Jim Boeheim, serving for his 26th year. The team played its home games at the Carrier Dome in Syracuse, New York. The team finished with a 23–13 (9–7) record, while making it to the Final Four round of the NIT tournament. The team was led by senior Preston Shumpert and juniors Kueth Duany and DeShaun Williams. Seniors Billy Celuck, sophomores Jeremy McNeil and James Thues and freshmen Craig Forth and Josh Pace and Hakim Warrick were also major contributors.

== Roster ==
2001–02 Syracuse Orange men's basketball team
Players
Coaches

Pos.	#	Name	Height	Weight	Year	Hometown
F	1	Hakim Warrick	6 ft 8 in (2.03 m)	205 lb (93 kg)	Fr	Wynnewood, Pennsylvania
G/F	3	Preston Shumpert	6 ft 6 in (1.98 m)	195 lb (88 kg)	Sr	Fort Walton Beach, Florida
G	13	Kueth Duany	6 ft 4 in (1.93 m)	190 lb (86 kg)	Jr	Bloomington, Indiana

Head coach

- Jim Boeheim (Syracuse)

Assistant coach(es)

- Bernie Fine (Syracuse)
- Mike Hopkins (Syracuse)

Legend

- (C) Team captain
- (S) Suspended
- (I) Ineligible
- (W) Walk-on
- Injured
- Current redshirt

Roster

- Preston Shumpert (20.7 ppg, 6.1 rpg)
- DeShaun Williams (15.9 ppg, 4.1 apg)
- Kueth Duany (12.2 ppg, 5.3 rpg)
- Hakim Warrick (6.1 ppg, 4.8 rpg)
- James Thues (5.6 ppg, 2.9 rpg)
- Craig Forth (4.9 ppg, 4.5 rpg)
- Josh Pace (4.3 ppg, 2.0 rpg)
- Jeremy McNeil (3.4 ppg, 3.7 rpg)
- Billy Celuck (1.9, 2.0 rpg)

== Developments ==
- Syracuse defeated Wake Forest to capture the Preseason NIT Championship.
- Although Syracuse was ranked as high as No. 7 at one point, Syracuse would lose 9-of-13 games, and would miss the NCAA Tournament for the first time since the 1996–97 season.
- Syracuse advanced to the NIT Postseason Semifinals, where it lost to South Carolina.
- Shumpert was named to the All-Big East First Team following the season.
- Following the season, guards DeShaun Williams and James Thues both left the team. Williams transferred to Iona while Thues left for Detroit.
