= 2002 NAIA Division I women's basketball tournament =

- Teams: 32
- Finals site: Oman Arena, Jackson, Tennessee
- Champions: Oklahoma City Stars (5th title, 5th title game, 5th Fab Four)
- Runner-up: Southern Nazarene Crimson Storm (7th title game, 11th Fab Four)
- Semifinalists: Central State Lady Marauders (1st Fab Four); Union University Bulldogs (5th Fab Four)
- Coach of the year: Janell Jones (Oklahoma City)
- Player of the year: Jadrea Seeley (Oklahoma Baptist)
- Charles Stevenson Hustle Award: Heather McNutt (Southern Nazarene)
- Chuck Taylor MVP: Jhudy Gonzalez (Oklahoma City)
- Top scorer: Courtney Hester (North Georgia) (82 points)

The 2002 NAIA Division I women's basketball tournament was the tournament held by the NAIA to determine the national champion of women's college basketball among its Division I members in the United States and Canada for the 2001–02 basketball season.

Three-time defending champions Oklahoma City defeated Southern Nazarene in the championship game, 82–73, to claim the Stars' fifth NAIA national title.

The tournament was played at the Oman Arena in Jackson, Tennessee.

== Qualification ==
The tournament field remained fixed at thirty-two teams, with the top sixteen teams receiving seeds.

The tournament continued to utilize a simple single-elimination format.

== Bracket ==
First round
1	Southern Nazarene	90
St. Francis (IL)	47
Fresno Pacific	59
16	Freed–Hardeman	83
9	Mobile	73
Shorter	50
Benedict	44
8	Campbellsville	88
5	Central State (OH)	87
Vanguard	65
Columbia (MO)	63
12	Lambuth	85
13	Trevecca Nazarene	60
Oklahoma Christian	86
Lindsey Wilson	44
4	Montana Western	58
3	Union (TN)	99
McKendree	63
Life	62
14	Cumberlands (KY)	50
11	Oklahoma Baptist	87
Xavier Louisiana	71
Auburn Montgomery	59
6	Houston Baptist	67
7	North Georgia	62
Dillard	51
Lewis–Clark State	81
10	Georgetown (KY)	66
15	Brescia	53
Azusa Pacific	52
Edward Waters	65
2	Oklahoma City	95

Second round
1	Southern Nazarene	75
16	Freed–Hardeman	58
9	Mobile	60
8	Campbellsville	61
5	Central State (OH)	84
12	Lambuth	67
Oklahoma Christian	60
4	Montana Western	68
3	Union (TN)	76
Life	66
11	Oklahoma Baptist	80
6	Houston Baptist	83
7	North Georgia	82
Lewis–Clark State	74
15	Brescia	48
2	Oklahoma City	79

Elite Eight
1	Southern Nazarene	75
8	Campbellsville	56
5	Central State (OH)	68
4	Montana Western	51
3	Union (TN)	71
6	Houston Baptist	50
7	North Georgia	80
2	Oklahoma City	93

Final Four
1	Southern Nazarene	87
5	Central State (OH)	77
3	Union (TN)	76
2	Oklahoma City	82

National championship
1	Southern Nazarene	73
2	Oklahoma City	82

== See also ==
- 2002 NAIA Division I men's basketball tournament
- 2002 NCAA Division I women's basketball tournament
- 2002 NCAA Division II women's basketball tournament
- 2002 NCAA Division III women's basketball tournament
- 2002 NAIA Division II women's basketball tournament
