= 2002 NAIA Division II men's basketball tournament =

- Teams: 32
- Finals site: Keeter Gymnasium; Point Lookout, Missouri
- Champions: Evangel Crusaders (1st title, 1st title game, 1st Fab Four)
- Runner-up: Robert Morris Eagles (1st title game, 1st Fab Four)
- Semifinalists: Cornerstone Golden Eagles (3rd Fab Four); Northwestern Red Raiders (3rd Fab Four)
- Charles Stevenson Hustle Award: Neil Foster (Warner Southern)
- Chuck Taylor MVP: Daniel Cutbirth (Evangel)
- Top scorer: Bobby Smith (Robert Morris (IL)) (156 points)

The 2002 NAIA Division II men's basketball tournament was the tournament held by the NAIA to determine the national champion of men's college basketball among its Division II members in the United States and Canada for the 2001–02 basketball season.

Top-seeded Evangel defeated Robert Morris (IL) in the championship game, 84–61, to claim the Crusaders' first NAIA national title.

The tournament was played at Keeter Gymnasium on the campus of the College of the Ozarks in Point Lookout, Missouri.

== Qualification ==
The tournament field remained fixed at thirty-two teams, and the top sixteen teams were seeded.

The tournament continued to utilize a single-elimination format.

== Bracket ==
First round
1 | Evangel | 79
St. Joseph (VT) | 49
Black Hills State | 72
16 | Brevard | 62
9 | Newman | 71
Holy Family | 73
Ottawa (KS) | 64
8 | Evergreen State | 71
5 | Siena Heights | 90
Northwestern St. Paul | 67
Briar Cliff | 69
12 | Saint Vincent | 77
13 | Huntington (IN) | 76
Holy Names | 60
Saint Joseph's (ME) | 69
4 | Northwestern (IA) | 86
3 | Cornerstone | 92
Mount St. Clare | 91
Bluefield (VA) | 48
14 | Caldwell | 68
11 | MidAmerica Nazarene | 81
Ohio Dominican | 70
College of the Ozarks | 80
6 | Jamestown | 82
7 | Robert Morris (IL) | 80
Menlo | 66
Bethel (TN) | 71
10 | Western Baptist | 69
15 | Walsh | 78
Sioux Falls | 94
Tabor | 78
2 | Warner Southern | 87

Second round
1 | Evangel | 83
Black Hills State | 66
Holy Family | 78
8 | Evergreen State | 74
5 | Siena Heights | 52
12 | Saint Vincent | 74
13 | Huntington (IN) | 80
4 | Northwestern (IA) | 92
3 | Cornerstone | 81
14 | Caldwell | 78
11 | MidAmerica Nazarene | 75
6 | Jamestown | 70
7 | Robert Morris (IL) | 89
Bethel (TN) | 72
Sioux Falls | 74
2 | Warner Southern | 88

Quarterfinals
1 | Evangel | 86
Holy Family | 57
12 | Saint Vincent | 62
4 | Northwestern (IA) | 72
3 | Cornerstone | 67
11 | MidAmerica Nazarene | 61
7 | Robert Morris (IL) | 81
2 | Warner Southern | 74

Semifinals
1 | Evangel | 81
4 | Northwestern (IA) | 79
3 | Cornerstone | 75
7 | Robert Morris (IL) | 82

National championship
1 | Evangel | 84
7 | Robert Morris (IL) | 61

== See also ==
- 2002 NAIA Division I men's basketball tournament
- 2002 NCAA Division I men's basketball tournament
- 2002 NCAA Division II men's basketball tournament
- 2002 NCAA Division III men's basketball tournament
- 2002 NAIA Division II women's basketball tournament
