= 2002 NAIA Division I men's basketball tournament =

College basketball tournament

- Teams: 32
- Finals site: Municipal Auditorium, Kansas City, Missouri
- Champions: USAO (1st title)
- Runner-up: Oklahoma Baptist (6th title game)
- Semifinalists: Azusa Pacific (3rd Final Four); Barat (1st Final Four)
- Coach of the year: Harry Statham (McKendree)
- Player of the year: DuJuan Brown and Robert Joseph (Oklahoma Baptist and Union (TN))
- Charles Stevenson Hustle Award: Troy Farrow, (Barat)
- Chuck Taylor MVP: Michael Williamson (USAO)
- Attendance: 21,456
- Top scorer: DuJuan Brown (Oklahoma Baptist) (136 points)

The 2002 Buffalo Funds - NAIA Division I men's basketball tournament was held in March at Municipal Auditorium in Kansas City, Missouri. This was the first NAIA tournament back in Kansas City since 1993. The NAIA headquarters also relocated to Olathe, Kansas this year. The 65th annual NAIA basketball tournament featured 32 teams playing in a single-elimination format. The 2002 champion was 2001's runner-up, University of Science and Arts of Oklahoma. The Drovers faced Sooner Athletic Conference rival Oklahoma Baptist University in the championship game. It was the first time two teams from the Sooner Athletic Conference ever met in the national championship game. And the first SAC team to win the tournament since Oklahoma City University won in 1996. The Drovers rolled over the Bison 96–79. Finishing out the NAIA Semifinals were Azusa Pacific University and Barat College.

2002 was also the first year Buffalo Funds, a Kansas City-based investment management firm, was the title corporate sponsor. In 2008 Buffalo Funds extended its contract with the NAIA tournament until the 2010 tournament; in 2013, it would be extended to 2017.

== Awards and honors ==
- Leading scorer: DuJuan Brown, Oklahoma Baptist (2001 winner) in 5 games DuJuan scored 51FG 21FT totaling 136pts (avg 27.2/game)
- Leading rebounder: Sidney Holmes, Barat in 4 games 49 rebounds (avg. 12.3)
- Most Three-Point Field Goals Made (All Tournament): 55, USAO (120 attempts)
- Most consecutive tournament appearances: 11th, Georgetown (KY)
- Most tournament appearances: Georgetown (KY), 21st of 28, appearances to the NAIA Tournament

== 2002 NAIA bracket ==
First round	Second round
1	Georgetown (KY)	88
-	Rocky Mountain	65
1	Georgetown (KY)	59
16	Oklahoma City	74
-	Houston Baptist	82
16	Oklahoma City	88
TOP TIER
9	Azusa Pacific	78
-	Spalding	44
9	Azusa Pacific	97
-	Auburn Montgomery	50
-	Auburn Montgomery	56
8	Southern–New Orleans	55
-	Lewis–Clark State	78
5	Oklahoma Baptist	89
5	Oklahoma Baptist	90
-	Martin Methodist	79
-	Martin Methodist	53
12	Spring Hill	47
TOP TIER
13	Edward Waters	64
-	Olivet Nazarene	80
-	Olivet Nazarene	85
4	McKendree	78
-	Georgia Southwestern State	71
4	McKendree	87
3	Biola	75
-	Barber–Scotia	46
3	Biola	79
-	USAO	92
-	USAO	68
14	Carroll (MT)	61
BOTTOM TIER
11	Cumberlands	69
-	Dillard	55
11	Cumberlands	73
-	Huston–Tillotson	78
-	Huston–Tillotson	83
6	Faulkner	68
7	Mountain State	85
-	Wayland Baptist	71
7	Mountain State	47
-	Westmont	75
-	Westmont	88
10	Southern Tech	77
BOTTOM TIER
15	Barat	93
-	Columbia (MO)	86
15	Barat	96
2	Union (TN)	87*
-	Westminster (UT)	52
2	Union (TN)	62

Elite Eight
16	Oklahoma City	72
9	Azusa Pacific	80
5	Oklahoma Baptist	89
-	Olivet Nazarene	69
-	USAO	92
-	Huston–Tillotson	77
-	Westmont	79
15	Barat	91

NAIA national semifinals
9	Azusa Pacific	81
5	Oklahoma Baptist	93
-	USAO	111
15	Barat	106*

NAIA national championship
5	Oklahoma Baptist	79
-	USAO	96

- * denotes overtime.

== See also ==
- 2002 NAIA Division I women's basketball tournament
- 2002 NCAA Division I men's basketball tournament
- 2002 NCAA Division II men's basketball tournament
- 2002 NCAA Division III men's basketball tournament
- 2002 NAIA Division II men's basketball tournament
