= 2002 NCAA Division II men's basketball tournament =

- Teams: 48
- Finals site: Roberts Municipal Stadium, Evansville, Indiana
- Champions: Metro State (2nd title)
- Runner-up: ~~Kentucky Wesleyan~~ (12th title game)
- Semifinalists: Indiana (PA) (2nd Final Four); Shaw (1st Final Four)
- Winning coach: Mike Dunlap (2nd title)
- MOP: Patrick Mutombo (Metro State)

The 2002 NCAA Division II men's basketball tournament was the 46th annual single-elimination tournament to determine the national champion of men's NCAA Division II college basketball in the United States.

Officially culminating the 2001–02 NCAA Division II men's basketball season, the tournament featured forty-eight teams from around the country.

The Elite Eight, national semifinals, and championship returned to the Roberts Municipal Stadium in Evansville, Indiana, the home of the first twenty College Division championships between 1957 and 1976.

Metro State (29–6) defeated defending champions Kentucky Wesleyan in the final, 80–72, to win their second Division II national championship and second in three seasons.

It was also Kentucky Wesleyan's fifth consecutive appearance in the title game (winning in 1999 and 2001), although their appearance was later vacated by the NCAA.

The Roadrunners were coached by Mike Dunlap. Metro State's Patrick Mutombo was the Most Outstanding Player.

2002 NCAA Division II Men's sites - regionals (cyan) Elite Eight (red)

== Regionals ==
=== Northeast - Old Westbury, New York ===
Location: Clark Athletic Center Host: Adelphi University, with support from State University of New York at Old Westbury

First round Round of 48; March 7
4	UMass Lowell	72
5	Bentley	70
3	Pace	92
6	Queens (NY)	88

Regional semifinals Round of 32; March 8
1	Adelphi	72
4	UMass Lowell	57
2	Assumption	91
3	Pace	73

Regional final Sweet 16; March 9
1	Adelphi	77
2	Assumption	56

=== Great Lakes - Owensboro, Kentucky ===
Location: Sportscenter Host: Kentucky Wesleyan College

First round Round of 48; March 7
4	Findlay	70
5	Gannon	53
3	Lewis	67
6	Hillsdale	53

Regional semifinals Round of 32; March 8
1	~~Kentucky Wesleyan~~	94
4	Findlay	89
2	Michigan Tech	51
3	Lewis	62

Regional final Sweet 16; March 9
1	~~Kentucky Wesleyan~~	80
3	Lewis	75

=== South Atlantic - Jefferson City, Tennessee ===
Location: Butler-Blanc Gymnasium Host: Carson-Newman College

First round Round of 48; March 7
4	Augusta State	70
5	Johnson C. Smith	73
3	Wingate	75
6	Winston-Salem State	90

Regional semifinals Round of 32; March 8
1	Carson–Newman	77
5	Johnson C. Smith	66
2	Shaw	62
6	Winston-Salem State	61

Regional final Sweet 16; March 9
1	Carson–Newman	68
2	Shaw	69

=== South - Tampa, Florida ===
Location: Bob Martinez Sports Center Host: University of Tampa

First round Round of 48; March 8
4	Delta State	71
5	West Georgia	76
3	Valdosta State	62
6	Paine	57

Regional semifinals Round of 32; March 9
1	Tampa	69
5	West Georgia	77
2	Henderson State	54
3	Valdosta State	80

Regional final Sweet 16; March 10
5	West Georgia	81
3	Valdosta State	69

=== East - Indiana, Pennsylvania ===
Location: Memorial Field House Host: Indiana University of Pennsylvania

First round Round of 48; March 7
4	Alderson-Broaddus	93
5	Charleston (OT)	96
3	Belmont Abbey	76
6	West Virginia Wesleyan	59

Regional semifinals Round of 32; March 8
1	Indiana (PA)	91
5	Charleston	81
2	Salem International	75
3	Belmont Abbey	69

Regional final Sweet 16; March 9
1	Indiana (PA)	85
2	Salem International	81

=== South Central - Tahlequah, Oklahoma ===
Location: Dobbins Fieldhouse Host: Northeastern State University

First round Round of 48; March 8
4	Rockhurst	75
5	Missouri Western	68
3	Incarnate Word	72
6	Tarleton State	59

Regional semifinals Round of 32; March 9
1	Northeastern State	70
4	Rockhurst (2OT)	75
2	Northwest Missouri State	61
3	Incarnate Word	56

Regional final Sweet 16; March 10
4	Rockhurst	73
2	Northwest Missouri State	79

=== North Central - Brookings, South Dakota ===
Location: Frost Arena Host: South Dakota State University

First round Round of 48; March 8
4	Nebraska-Omaha	88
5	Fort Lewis	58
3	Metro State	66
6	Minnesota-Duluth	61

Regional semifinals Round of 32; March 9
1	South Dakota State	96
4	Nebraska-Omaha	76
2	Nebraska–Kearney	51
3	Metro State	59

Regional final Sweet 16; March 10
1	South Dakota State	86
3	Metro State	87

=== West - San Bernardino, California ===
Location: James and Aerianthi Coussoulis Arena Host: California State University, San Bernardino

First round Round of 48; March 7
4	Cal State Bakersfield	84
5	Montana State-Billings	81
3	Seattle Pacific	82
6	Brigham Young-Hawai'i	57

Regional semifinals Round of 32; March 8
1	Cal State San Bernardino	66
4	Cal State Bakersfield	62
2	Humboldt State	89
3	Seattle Pacific	82

Regional final Sweet 16; March 9
1	Cal State San Bernardino	80
2	Humboldt State	65

== Elite Eight - Evansville, Indiana ==
Location: Roberts Municipal Stadium Host: University of Southern Indiana

National Quarterfinals; Elite Eight; March 20
E	Indiana (PA)	'78
SC	Northwest Missouri State	72
NC	Metro State	65
W	Cal State San Bernardino	48
Evansville, Indiana
SA	Shaw	102
S	West Georgia	84
GL	~~Kentucky Wesleyan~~	71
NE	Adelphi	46

National semifinals Final Four; March 21
E	Indiana (PA)	52
SC	Metro State	82
SA	Shaw	92
GL	~~Kentucky Wesleyan~~	101

National championship March 23
SC	Metro State	80
GL	~~Kentucky Wesleyan~~	72

- Note: Kentucky Wesleyan's performance was vacated by the NCAA.

== All-tournament team ==
- Patrick Mutombo, Metro State (MOP)
- Clayton Smith, Metro State
- ~~Chris Landry, Kentucky Wesleyan~~
- ~~Ronald Evans, Kentucky Wesleyan~~
- Ronald Murray, Shaw

== See also ==
- 2002 NCAA Division II women's basketball tournament
- 2002 NCAA Division I men's basketball tournament
- 2002 NCAA Division III men's basketball tournament
- 2002 NAIA Division I men's basketball tournament
- 2002 NAIA Division II men's basketball tournament
