= 2002 NCAA Division III men's basketball tournament =

American collegiate men's basketball tournament (2002)

- Teams: 48
- Finals site: , Salem, Virginia
- Champions: Otterbein (1st title)
- Runner-up: Elizabethtown (1st title game)
- Semifinalists: Carthage (1st Final Four); Rochester (3rd Final Four)
- Winning coach: Dick Reynolds (Otterbein)
- MOP: Jeff Gibbs (Otterbein)
- Attendance: 74,437

The 2002 NCAA Division III men's basketball tournament was the 28th annual single-elimination tournament to determine the national champions of National Collegiate Athletic Association (NCAA) men's Division III collegiate basketball in the United States.

The field contained forty-eight teams, and each program was allocated to one of four sectionals. All sectional games were played on campus sites, while the national semifinals, third-place final, and championship finals were contested at the Salem Civic Center in Salem, Virginia.

Otterbein defeated Elizabethtown, 102–83, in the championship, clinching their first national title.

The Cardinals (30–3) were coached by Dick Reynolds.

Jeff Gibbs, also from Otterbein, was named Most Outstanding Player.

== Bracket ==
=== Top left sectional ===
First round
UW–Oshkosh	71
Ripon	56
Lewis & Clark	81
Claremont–Mudd–Scripps	59
St. Norbert	53
Hope	54
Gustavus Adolphus	74
Edgewood	65

Second round
St. Thomas (MN)	85
UW–Oshkosh	88*
Lewis & Clark	70
Mississippi College	57
Carthage	63
Hope	57
Gustavus Adolphus	88
Buena Vista	60

Sectional semifinals
UW–Oshkosh	71
Lewis & Clark	79
Carthage	71
Gustavus Adolphus	65

Sectional finals
Lewis & Clark	70
Carthage	85

=== Bottom left sectional ===
First round
Maryville (TN)	70
Webster	45
Wittenberg	75
Franklin	44
Gettysburg	59
Lycoming	78
Pitt–Bradford	98
Bethany (WV)	110

Second round
Washington–St. Louis	71
Maryville (TN)	57
Wittenberg	76
DePauw	89
Randolph–Macon	79
Lycoming	62
Bethany (WV)	89
Otterbein	121

Sectional semifinals
Washington–St. Louis	87
DePauw	90
Randolph–Macon	72
Otterbein	85

Sectional finals
DePauw	79
Otterbein	87

=== Top right sectional ===
First round
Williams	121
Cazenovia	49
Union (NY)	75
Lasell	73
Western Connecticut	92
Salem State	89
Trinity (CT)	75
Colby–Sawyer	47

Second round
Rochester	66
Williams	51
Union (NY)	50
Babson	63
Amherst	82
Western Connecticut	77
Trinity (CT)	61
Brockport State	80

Sectional semifinals
Rochester	71
Babson	60
Amherst	65
Brockport State	69

Sectional finals
Rochester	71
Brockport State	62

=== Bottom right sectional ===
First round
Alvernia	76
Ithaca	67
Kings Point	73
Cabrini	85
Clark (MA)	84
Suffolk	77
Hampden–Sydney	92
North Carolina Wesleyan	79

Second round
Elizabethtown	95
Alvernia	84
Cabrini	47
William Paterson	43
Staten Island	72
Clark (MA)	101
Hampden–Sydney	66
Catholic	74

Sectional semifinals
Elizabethtown	87
Cabrini	85
Clark (MA)	75
Catholic	72

Sectional finals
Elizabethtown	94
Clark (MA)	90

=== National finals ===
- Site: Salem Civic Center, Salem, Virginia

National semifinals
Carthage	66
Otterbein	70
Rochester	83
Elizabethtown	93*

National championship
Otterbein	102
Elizabethtown	83
National third-place
Carthage	72
Rochester	51

== See also ==
- 2002 NCAA Division I men's basketball tournament
- 2002 NCAA Division II men's basketball tournament
- 2002 NCAA Division III women's basketball tournament
- 2002 NAIA Division I men's basketball tournament
- 2002 NAIA Division II men's basketball tournament
