= 1999–2000 UNC Wilmington Seahawks men's basketball team =

American college basketball season

1999–2000 UNC Wilmington Seahawks men's basketball

CAA tournament champion

NCAA tournament
- Conference: Colonial Athletic Association
- Record: 18–13 (8–8 CAA)
- Head coach: Jerry Wainwright (6th season)
- Home arena: Trask Coliseum

1999–2000 CAA men's basketball standings
	Conf.				Overall
Team	W		L	PCT	W		L	PCT
George Mason	12	–	4	.750	19	–	11	.633
James Madison	12	–	4	.750	20	–	9	.690
Richmond	11	–	5	.688	18	–	12	.600
UNC Wilmington †	8	–	8	.500	18	–	13	.581
VCU	7	–	9	.438	14	–	14	.500
Old Dominion	6	–	10	.375	11	–	19	.367
William & Mary	6	–	10	.375	11	–	17	.393
American	5	–	11	.313	11	–	18	.379
East Carolina	5	–	11	.313	10	–	18	.357
† 2000 CAA tournament winner Rankings from AP Poll

The 1999–2000 UNC Wilmington Seahawks men's basketball team represented the University of North Carolina Wilmington during the 1999–2000 NCAA Division I men's basketball season. The Seahawks, led by sixth-year head coach Jerry Wainwright, played their home games at the Trask Coliseum and were members of the Colonial Athletic Association (CAA).

After finishing fourth place in the CAA regular season standings, the Seahawks won the CAA tournament to receive an automatic bid to the NCAA tournament – the first appearance in school history – as No. 15 seed in the South region. UNC Wilmington lost to No. 2 seed Cincinnati in the opening round.

== Roster ==
1999–2000 UNC Wilmington Seahawks men's basketball team
Players	Coaches
Pos. / # / Name / Height / Weight / Year / Hometown; G / 11 / Brett Blizzard / 6 ft 4 in (1.93 m) / 185 lb (84 kg) / Fr / Tallahassee, Florida	Head coach: Jerry Wainwright; Assistant coach(es) Legend: (C) Team captain; (S) Suspended; (I) Ineligible; (W) Walk-on; Injured; Current redshirt; Roster

== Schedule and results ==
Date time, TV	Rank^{#}	Opponent^{#}	Result	Record	Site (attendance) city, state
Regular season
Nov 20, 1999*		at Wisconsin–Green Bay	L 38–46	0–1	Brown County Arena; Ashwaubenon, Wisconsin
Nov 23, 1999*		Butler	W 56–54	1–1	Trask Coliseum; Wilmington, North Carolina
Nov 27, 1999*		vs. Campbell	W 73–60	2–1	
Dec 1, 1999		William & Mary	W 76–66	3–1 (1–0)	Trask Coliseum; Wilmington, North Carolina
Dec 2, 1999*		Washington	W 68–59	4–1	Trask Coliseum; Wilmington, North Carolina
Dec 18, 1999		at Old Dominion	W 60–49	5–1 (2–0)	Norfolk Scope; Norfolk, Virginia
Dec 21, 1999*		at Central Florida	W 74–60	6–1	UCF Arena; Orlando, Florida
Dec 23, 1999*		at No. 8 Florida	L 53–80	6–2	Stephen C. O'Connell Center; Gainesville, Florida
Dec 28, 1999*		at No. 5 Arizona; Bank One Fiesta Bowl Classic	L 51–66	6–3	McKale Center; Tucson, Arizona
Dec 30, 1999*		vs. Alabama; Bank One Fiesta Bowl Classic	L 45–62	6–4	McKale Center; Tucson, Arizona
Jan 5, 2000		at Richmond	L 57–63	6–5 (2–1)	Robins Center; Richmond, Virginia
Jan 8, 2000		at American	L 58–60	6–6 (2–2)	Bender Arena; Washington, D.C.
Jan 10, 2000		at George Mason	L 58–74	6–7 (2–3)	Patriot Center; Fairfax, Virginia
Jan 15, 2000*		Belmont	W 70–47	7–7	Trask Coliseum; Wilmington, North Carolina
Jan 17, 2000*		Illinois-Chicago	W 54–52	8–7	Trask Coliseum; Wilmington, North Carolina
Jan 19, 2000		VCU	W 71–61	9–7 (3–3)	Trask Coliseum; Wilmington, North Carolina
Jan 22, 2000		at East Carolina	L 57–65	9–8 (3–4)	Williams Arena at Minges Coliseum; Greenville, North Carolina
Jan 29, 2000		American	W 69–46	10–8 (4–4)	Trask Coliseum; Wilmington, North Carolina
Feb 2, 2000		at Richmond	L 48–49	10–9 (4–5)	Robins Center; Richmond, Virginia
Feb 5, 2000		Old Dominion	W 66–60	11–9 (5–5)	Trask Coliseum; Wilmington, North Carolina
Feb 7, 2000		James Madison	W 57–32	12–9 (6–5)	Trask Coliseum; Wilmington, North Carolina
Feb 12, 2000		at VCU	L 54–55 ^{OT}	12–10 (6–6)	Siegel Center; Richmond, Virginia
Feb 14, 2000*		at Belmont	W 66–58	13–10	Striplin Gym; Nashville, Tennessee
Feb 19, 2000		George Mason	W 59–53	14–10 (7–6)	Trask Coliseum; Wilmington, North Carolina
Feb 23, 2000		at William & Tribe	L 53–58	14–11 (7–7)	Kaplan Arena; Williamsburg, Virginia
Feb 26, 2000		East Carolina	W 70–55	15–11 (8–7)	Trask Coliseum; Wilmington, North Carolina
Feb 28, 2000		at James Madison	L 65–67	15–12 (8–8)	JMU Convocation Center; Harrisonburg, Virginia
CAA tournament
Mar 4, 2000*		at VCU; Quarterfinals	W 66–57	16–12	Richmond Coliseum; Richmond, Virginia
Mar 5, 2000*		vs. George Mason; Semifinals	W 67–56	17–12	Richmond Coliseum; Richmond, Virginia
Mar 6, 2000*		vs. Richmond; Championship game	W 57–47	18–12	Richmond Coliseum; Richmond, Virginia
NCAA tournament
Mar 17, 2000*	(15 S)	vs. (2 S) No. 7 Cincinnati; First Round	L 47–64	18–13	Gaylord Entertainment Center; Nashville, Tennessee
*Non-conference game. ^{#}Rankings from AP poll. (#) Tournament seedings in parentheses. S=South. All times are in Eastern Time.

== Awards and honors ==
- Brett Blizzard – CAA tournament MVP
