= 1999–2000 Alabama Crimson Tide men's basketball team =

American college basketball season

1999–2000 Alabama Crimson Tide men's basketball
- Conference: Southeastern Conference
- Western Division
- Record: 13–16 (6–10 SEC)
- Head coach: Mark Gottfried (2nd season)
- Assistant coaches: Philip Pearson; Tom Kelsey; Robert Scott
- Home arena: Coleman Coliseum

1999–2000 Southeastern Conference men's basketball standings
	Conf.				Overall
Team	W		L	PCT	W		L	PCT
East
No. 13 Florida	12	–	4	.750	29	–	8	.784
No. 11 Tennessee	12	–	4	.750	26	–	7	.788
No. 19 Kentucky	12	–	4	.750	23	–	10	.697
Vanderbilt	8	–	8	.500	19	–	11	.633
South Carolina	5	–	11	.313	15	–	17	.469
Georgia	3	–	13	.188	10	–	20	.333
West
No. 10 LSU	12	–	4	.750	28	–	6	.824
No. 24 Auburn	9	–	7	.563	24	–	10	.706
Arkansas †	7	–	9	.438	19	–	15	.559
Alabama	6	–	10	.375	13	–	16	.448
Ole Miss	5	–	11	.313	19	–	14	.576
Mississippi State	5	–	11	.313	14	–	16	.467
† 2000 SEC tournament winner Rankings from AP Poll

The 1999–2000 Alabama Crimson Tide men's basketball team (variously "Alabama", "UA", "Bama" or "The Tide") represented the University of Alabama in the 1999–2000 college basketball season. The head coach was Mark Gottfried, who was in his second season at Alabama. The team played its home games at Coleman Coliseum in Tuscaloosa, Alabama and was a member of the Southeastern Conference. This was the 88th season of basketball in the school's history. The Crimson Tide finished the season 13–16, 6–10 in SEC play, they lost in the first round of the 2000 SEC men's basketball tournament.

== Schedule and results ==
Date time, TV	Rank^{#}	Opponent^{#}	Result	Record	Site (attendance) city, state
Non-conference regular season
November 13, 1999*		vs. Northern Iowa; Earth Grains Classic	L 73–74	0–1	Kiel Center; St. Louis, MO
November 14, 1999*		at Saint Louis; Earth Grains Classic	L 70–78	0–2	Kiel Center; St. Louis, MO
November 19, 1999*		Weber State	W 81–61	1–2	Coleman Coliseum; Tuscaloosa, AL
November 22, 1999*		Tennessee Tech	W 91–72	2–2	Coleman Coliseum; Tuscaloosa, AL
November 26, 1999*		Centenary	W 94–72	3–2	Coleman Coliseum; Tuscaloosa, AL
November 27, 1999*		La Salle	W 85–70	4–2	Coleman Coliseum; Tuscaloosa, AL
December 2, 1999*		Samford	L 67–79	4–3	Coleman Coliseum; Tuscaloosa, AL
December 11, 1999*		at Louisville	L 72–87	4–4	Freedom Hall; Louisville, KY
December 18, 1999*		vs. Chattanooga	W 75–51	5–4	Von Braun Center; Huntsville, AL
December 21, 1999*		Alabama A&M	W 97–74	6–4	Coleman Coliseum; Tuscaloosa, AL
December 28, 1999*		vs. Delaware; Bank One Fiesta Bowl Classic	L 66–76	6–5	McKale Center; Tucson, AZ
December 30, 1999*		vs. UNC Wilmington; Bank One Fiesta Bowl Classic	W 62–45	7–5	McKale Center; Tucson, AZ
SEC regular season
January 5, 2000		at LSU	L 66–78	7–6 (0–1)	Pete Maravich Assembly Center; Baton Rouge, LA
January 8, 2000		Mississippi State	W 77–74 ^{OT}	8–6 (1–1)	Coleman Coliseum; Tuscaloosa, AL
January 15, 2000		at Georgia	L 59–75	8–7 (1–2)	Stegeman Coliseum; Athens, GA
January 19, 2000		Arkansas	W 73–64	9–7 (2–2)	Coleman Coliseum; Tuscaloosa, AL
January 22, 2000		No. 9 Florida	L 73–77	9–8 (2–3)	Coleman Coliseum; Tuscaloosa, AL
January 29, 2000		Ole Miss	W 96–67	10–8 (3–3)	Coleman Coliseum; Tuscaloosa, AL
February 2, 2000		at No. 10 Auburn; Iron Bowl of basketball	L 63–77	10–9 (3–4)	Beard-Eaves-Memorial Coliseum; Auburn, AL
February 5, 2000		No. 22 LSU	L 60–93	10–10 (3–5)	Coleman Coliseum; Tuscaloosa, AL
February 9, 2000		at Arkansas	L 66–81	10–11 (3–6)	Bud Walton Arena; Fayetteville, Arkansas
February 12, 2000		Vanderbilt	W 77–63	11–11 (4–6)	Coleman Coliseum; Tuscaloosa, AL
February 16, 2000		at No. 19 Kentucky	L 54–66	11–12 (4–7)	Rupp Arena; Lexington, KY
February 19, 2000		at South Carolina	L 61–82	11–13 (4–8)	Carolina Coliseum; Columbia, SC
February 22, 2000		No. 11 Auburn; Iron Bowl of Basketball	W 68–64	12–13 (5–8)	Coleman Coliseum; Tuscaloosa, AL
February 26, 2000		No. 7 Tennessee	W 80–75	13–13 (6–8)	Coleman Coliseum; Tuscaloosa, AL
March 1, 2000		at Ole Miss	L 59–63	13–14 (6–9)	Tad Smith Coliseum; Oxford, MS
March 4, 2000		at Mississippi State	L 70–92	13–15 (6–10)	Humphrey Coliseum; Starkville, MS
SEC tournament
March 9, 2000	(W4)	vs. (E5) South Carolina; First Round	L 59–69	13–16	Georgia Dome; Atlanta, GA
*Non-conference game. ^{#}Rankings from AP Poll. (#) Tournament seedings in parentheses. All times are in Central Time.

== See also ==
- 1999–2000 NCAA Division I men's basketball season
- 1999–2000 NCAA Division I men's basketball rankings
