= 1999–2000 Auburn Tigers men's basketball team =

American college basketball season

1999–2000 Auburn Tigers men's basketball

San Juan Shootout champions

NCAA tournament, second round
- Conference: Southeastern Conference
- West

Ranking
- AP: No. 24
- Record: 24–10 (9–7 SEC)
- Head coach: Cliff Ellis (6th season)
- Captains: Doc Robinson; Chris Porter
- Home arena: Beard–Eaves–Memorial Coliseum

1999–2000 Southeastern Conference men's basketball standings
	Conf.				Overall
Team	W		L	PCT	W		L	PCT
East
No. 13 Florida	12	–	4	.750	29	–	8	.784
No. 11 Tennessee	12	–	4	.750	26	–	7	.788
No. 19 Kentucky	12	–	4	.750	23	–	10	.697
Vanderbilt	8	–	8	.500	19	–	11	.633
South Carolina	5	–	11	.313	15	–	17	.469
Georgia	3	–	13	.188	10	–	20	.333
West
No. 10 LSU	12	–	4	.750	28	–	6	.824
No. 24 Auburn	9	–	7	.563	24	–	10	.706
Arkansas †	7	–	9	.438	19	–	15	.559
Alabama	6	–	10	.375	13	–	16	.448
Ole Miss	5	–	11	.313	19	–	14	.576
Mississippi State	5	–	11	.313	14	–	16	.467
† 2000 SEC tournament winner Rankings from AP Poll

The 1999–2000 Auburn Tigers men's basketball team represented Auburn University in the 1999–2000 college basketball season. The team's head coach was Cliff Ellis, who was in his sixth season at Auburn. The team played their home games at Beard–Eaves–Memorial Coliseum in Auburn, Alabama. They finished the season 24–10, 9–7 in SEC play. They defeated Florida and South Carolina to advance to the SEC tournament championship game where they lost to Arkansas. They received an at-large bid to the NCAA tournament where they defeated Creighton to advance to the Second Round where they lost to Iowa State.

The Tigers began the season with high hopes, being ranked #4 in the Associated Press pre-season polls. They stayed in the Top 10 for most of the season until, after Auburn's 68-64 loss on February 22, 2000 to Alabama, it was discovered star forward Chris Porter had accepted money from an agent. Porter was suspended for the remainder of the regular season, the SEC tournament, and the NCAA tournament.

== Previous season ==
The Tigers finished the 1998–99 season 29–4, 14–2 in SEC play to win the SEC regular season championship. As the top seed out of the West division in the SEC tournament, the Tigers defeated Alabama to advance to the semifinals of the SEC tournament where they lost to Kentucky. They received an at-large bid to the NCAA tournament as a 1 seed for the first time in program history. They defeated Winthrop and Oklahoma State to advance to the program's first Sweet Sixteen since 1986, where they lost to Ohio State.

== Roster ==
1999–2000 Auburn Tigers men's basketball team
Players
Coaches

Pos.	#	Name	Height	Weight	Year	Previous school	Hometown
G	3	Marquis Daniels	6 ft 6 in (1.98 m)	190 lb (86 kg)	Fr	Mount Zion Christian Academy	Orlando, Florida
F	4	Chris Porter	6 ft 7 in (2.01 m)	218 lb (99 kg)	Sr	Chipola JC	Abbeville, Alabama
G	10	Scott Pohlman	6 ft 2 in (1.88 m)	170 lb (77 kg)	Jr	Roswell	Roswell, Georgia
G	11	Reggie Sharp	6 ft 1 in (1.85 m)	185 lb (84 kg)	Jr	West Georgia	Shannon, Mississippi
G	23	Daymeon Fishback	6 ft 5 in (1.96 m)	218 lb (99 kg)	Sr	Greenwood	Bowling Green, Kentucky
F	31	Mack McGadney	6 ft 7 in (2.01 m)	245 lb (111 kg)	So	LeFlore	Mobile, Alabama
C	34	Mamadou N'Diaye	7 ft 0 in (2.13 m)	245 lb (111 kg)	Sr	Maine Central Institute	Dakar, Senegal
G	50	Doc Robinson	6 ft 2 in (1.88 m)	185 lb (84 kg)	Sr	Selma	Selma, Alabama

Head coach

- Cliff Ellis

Assistant coach(es)

Legend

- (C) Team captain
- (S) Suspended
- (I) Ineligible
- (W) Walk-on
- Injured
- Current redshirt

Roster

== Schedule and results ==
Date time, TV	Rank^{#}	Opponent^{#}	Result	Record	High points	High rebounds	High assists	Site (attendance) city, state
Exhibition
November 2, 1999*	No. 4	Next Level Sports	W 80–62	–	23 – Fishback	10 – Robinson	5 – Robinson	Beard–Eaves–Memorial Coliseum; Auburn, AL
November 11, 1999*	No. 4	Global Sports All-Stars	W 82–62	–	21 – Porter	10 – Porter	5 – Sharp	Beard–Eaves–Memorial Coliseum; Auburn, AL
Regular season
November 19, 1999*; FSS	No. 3	UAB; Rivalry	W 65–59	1–0	11 – Tied	14 – N'diaye	5 – Robinson	Beard–Eaves–Memorial Coliseum; Auburn, AL
November 21, 1999*; CSS	No. 3	Arkansas–Pine Bluff	W 100–44	2–0	21 – N'diaye	18 – N'diaye	11 – Robinson	Beard–Eaves–Memorial Coliseum; Auburn, AL
November 27, 1999*; K-CAL 9	No. 2	vs. No. 9 Stanford; John R. Wooden Classic	L 58–67	2–1	21 – Pohlman	8 – N'diaye	6 – Robinson	Arrowhead Pond (14,179); Anaheim, CA
December 1, 1999*	No. 7	Belmont	W 65–56	3–1	15 – McGadney	12 – Porter	7 – Robinson	Beard–Eaves–Memorial Coliseum; Auburn, AL
December 5, 1999*; FSS	No. 7	Florida State	W 55–54	4–1	17 – Robinson	9 – Fishback	5 – Robinson	Beard–Eaves–Memorial Coliseum; Auburn, AL
December 11, 1999*; ESPN	No. 8	vs. Penn; Arby's Hardwood Classic	W 77–70	5–1	16 – Tied	10 – N'diaye	6 – Robinson	BJCC Arena (13,141); Birmingham, AL
December 13, 1999*; CSS	No. 6	Coppin State	W 63–35	6–1	14 – Pohlman	8 – McGadney	6 – Brewer	Beard–Eaves–Memorial Coliseum; Auburn, AL
December 16, 1999*; CSN	No. 6	vs. Bradley; Coors Classic	W 78–64	7–1	18 – Fishback	10 – Porter	6 – Brewer	Mitchell Center (7,340); Mobile, AL
December 20, 1999*	No. 7	at Puerto Rico–Mayagüez; San Juan Shootout	W 109–52	8–1	16 – Daniels	9 – McGadney	5 – Tied	Mario Morales Coliseum (300); Guaynabo, P.R.
December 21, 1999*	No. 7	vs. Virginia Tech; San Juan Shootout	W 73–63	9–1	17 – Porter	10 – Porter	3 – Tied	Mario Morales Coliseum (250); Guaynabo, P.R.
December 22, 1999*	No. 7	vs. Pepperdine; San Juan Shootout	W 87–76	10–1	19 – Porter	10 – N'diaye	5 – Robinson	Mario Morales Coliseum (275); Guaynabo, P.R.
December 30, 1999*; CSS	No. 4	Southern Miss	W 56–50	11–1	13 – Porter	11 – N'diaye	5 – Tied	Beard–Eaves–Memorial Coliseum; Auburn, AL
January 2, 2000*	No. 4	Stony Brook	W 100–45	12–1	15 – Porter	7 – Tied	8 – Robinson	Beard–Eaves–Memorial Coliseum; Auburn, AL
January 8, 2000; JP	No. 4	Georgia	W 67–52	13–1 (1–0)	14 – Pohlman	10 – N'diaye	3 – Tied	Beard–Eaves–Memorial Coliseum; Auburn, AL
January 11, 2000; ESPN	No. 4	No. 20 Kentucky	W 66–63	14–1 (2–0)	22 – Porter	13 – Porter	9 – Robinson	Beard–Eaves–Memorial Coliseum; Auburn, AL
January 16, 2000; JP	No. 4	at Mississippi State	W 51–45	15–1 (3–0)	14 – Robinson	8 – N'diaye	4 – Fishback	Humphrey Coliseum (7,562); Starkville, MS
January 19, 2000; CSS	No. 4	South Carolina	W 65–61	16–1 (4–0)	19 – Pohlman	8 – N'diaye	8 – Robinson	Beard–Eaves–Memorial Coliseum; Auburn, AL
January 22, 2000; JP	No. 4	at Ole Miss	L 77–79 ^{OT}	16–2 (4–1)	19 – Pohlman	8 – Porter	7 – Robinson	Tad Smith Coliseum (6,881); Oxford, MS
January 25, 2000; ESPN	No. 7	at No. 11 Tennessee	L 76–105	16–3 (4–2)	25 – Porter	6 – Tied	8 – Robinson	Thompson–Boling Arena (19,405); Knoxville, TN
January 29, 2000; JP	No. 7	Mississippi State	W 73–57	17–3 (5–2)	20 – Porter	6 – Hamilton	6 – Robinson	Beard–Eaves–Memorial Coliseum; Auburn, AL
February 2, 2000; CSS	No. 10	Alabama; Rivalry	W 73–58	18–3 (6–2)	22 – Porter	13 – N'diaye	7 – Robinson	Beard–Eaves–Memorial Coliseum; Auburn, AL
February 5, 2000; JP	No. 10	Arkansas	W 73–55	19–3 (7–2)	21 – Pohlman	7 – Tied	4 – Robinson	Beard–Eaves–Memorial Coliseum; Auburn, AL
February 9, 2000	No. 9	at No. 25 LSU	L 68–83	19–4 (7–3)	19 – McGadney	8 – McGadney	5 – Robinson	Pete Maravich Assembly Center; Baton Rouge, LA
February 16, 2000	No. 12	at Vanderbilt	W 86–80	20–4 (8–3)	15 – Tied	8 – Porter	5 – Robinson	Memorial Gymnasium; Nashville, TN
February 19, 2000; FSS	No. 12	Ole Miss	W 75–72	21–4 (9–3)	19 – Pohlman	8 – N'diaye	7 – Robinson	Beard–Eaves–Memorial Coliseum; Auburn, AL
February 22, 2000; ESPN	No. 11	at Alabama; Rivalry	L 64–68	21–5 (9–4)	21 – Porter	12 – Porter	5 – Robinson	Coleman Coliseum; Tuscaloosa, AL
February 27, 1999; CBS	No. 11	at No. 9 Florida	L 59–88	21–6 (9–5)	21 – Robinson	8 – N'diaye	3 – Tied	O'Connell Center; Gainesville, FL
March 1, 2000; JP	No. 19	No. 12 LSU	L 53–55	21–7 (9–6)	17 – McGadney	6 – Robinson	5 – Robinson	Beard–Eaves–Memorial Coliseum; Auburn, AL
March 5, 2000; CBS	No. 19	at Arkansas	L 55–64	21–8 (9–7)	19 – McGadney	10 – N'diaye	2 – N'diaye	Bud Walton Arena (19,842); Fayetteville, AR
SEC tournament
March 10, 2000; JP	(W2)	vs. (E3) No. 11 Florida; Quarterfinals	W 78–70	22–8	21 – Fishback	14 – Fishback	2 – Tied	Georgia Dome (24,447); Atlanta, GA
March 11, 2000; JP	(W2)	vs. (E5) South Carolina; Semifinals	W 77–72 ^{OT}	23–8	15 – Pohlman	10 – N'diaye	5 – Robinson	Georgia Dome (21,216); Atlanta, GA
March 12, 2000; CBS	(W2)	vs. (W3) Arkansas; Championship	L 67–75	23–9	15 – Tied	15 – McGadney	3 – Robinson	Georgia Dome (19,427); Atlanta, GA
NCAA tournament
March 16, 2000*; CBS	(7) No. 24	vs. (10) Creighton; First Round	W 72–69	24–9	16 – Fishback	11 – N'diaye	6 – Robinson	Hubert H. Humphrey Metrodome (20,013); Minneapolis, MN
March 18, 2000*; CBS	(7) No. 24	vs. (2) No. 6 Iowa State; Second Round	L 60–79	24–10	12 – Tied	7 – Daniels	3 – Tied	Hubert H. Humphrey Metrodome (26,328); Minneapolis, MN
*Non-conference game. ^{#}Rankings from AP Poll. (#) Tournament seedings in parentheses. All times are in Central Time.
