= 1999–2000 LSU Tigers basketball team =

American college basketball season

1999–2000 LSU Tigers basketball

SEC regular season champions SEC West champions

NCAA tournament, Sweet Sixteen
- Conference: Southeastern Conference

Ranking
- Coaches: No. 13
- AP: No. 10
- Record: 28–6 (12–4 SEC)
- Head coach: John Brady (3rd season)
- Home arena: Pete Maravich Assembly Center

1999–2000 Southeastern Conference men's basketball standings
	Conf.				Overall
Team	W		L	PCT	W		L	PCT
East
No. 13 Florida	12	–	4	.750	29	–	8	.784
No. 11 Tennessee	12	–	4	.750	26	–	7	.788
No. 19 Kentucky	12	–	4	.750	23	–	10	.697
Vanderbilt	8	–	8	.500	19	–	11	.633
South Carolina	5	–	11	.313	15	–	17	.469
Georgia	3	–	13	.188	10	–	20	.333
West
No. 10 LSU	12	–	4	.750	28	–	6	.824
No. 24 Auburn	9	–	7	.563	24	–	10	.706
Arkansas †	7	–	9	.438	19	–	15	.559
Alabama	6	–	10	.375	13	–	16	.448
Ole Miss	5	–	11	.313	19	–	14	.576
Mississippi State	5	–	11	.313	14	–	16	.467
† 2000 SEC tournament winner Rankings from AP Poll

The 1999–2000 LSU Tigers basketball team represented Louisiana State University in the Southeastern Conference (SEC) during the 1999–2000 NCAA Division I men's basketball season. The team was coached by John Brady and played their home games at Pete Maravich Assembly Center in Baton Rouge, Louisiana.

== Roster ==
1999–2000 LSU Tigers men's basketball team
Players
Coaches

Pos.	#	Name	Height	Weight	Year	Hometown
F	4	Stromile Swift	6 ft 9 in (2.06 m)	225 lb (102 kg)	So	Shreveport, Louisiana
C	52	Jabari Smith	6 ft 11 in (2.11 m)	250 lb (113 kg)	Sr	Atlanta, Georgia

Head coach

- John Brady (Belhaven)

Assistant coach(es)

- Kermit Davis (Mississippi State)
- Butch Pierre (Mississippi State)
- Donnie Tyndall (Morehead State)

Legend

- (C) Team captain
- (S) Suspended
- (I) Ineligible
- (W) Walk-on
- Injured
- Current redshirt

Roster

== Schedule ==
Date time, TV	Rank^{#}	Opponent^{#}	Result	Record	Site (attendance) city, state
Regular season
Nov 20, 1999*		Grambling	W 112–37	1–0	Maravich Assembly Center; Baton Rouge, Louisiana
Nov 22, 1999*		Southeastern Louisiana	W 75–36	2–0	Maravich Assembly Center; Baton Rouge, Louisiana
Nov 26, 1999*		vs. Oakland; Hawaii Pacific Classic	W 87–80	3–0	Neal S. Blaisdell Center; Honolulu, Hawaii
Nov 27, 1999*		vs. Wyoming; Hawaii Pacific Classic	W 103–86	4–0	Neal S. Blaisdell Center; Honolulu, Hawaii
Nov 28, 1999*		vs. Fresno State; Hawaii Pacific Classic	W 95–85	5–0	Neal S. Blaisdell Center; Honolulu, Hawaii
Dec 11, 1999*		Alcorn State	W 71–64	6–0	Maravich Assembly Center; Baton Rouge, Louisiana
Dec 14, 1999*		Tennessee-Martin	W 73–45	7–0	Maravich Assembly Center; Baton Rouge, Louisiana
Dec 18, 1999*		Sam Houston State	W 85–67	8–0	Maravich Assembly Center; Baton Rouge, Louisiana
Dec 21, 1999*		vs. Centenary	W 80–52	9–0	Shreveport, Louisiana
Dec 23, 1999*		Nicholls State	W 91–74	10–0	Maravich Assembly Center; Baton Rouge, Louisiana
Dec 27, 1999*		Howard	W 81–55	11–0	Maravich Assembly Center; Baton Rouge, Louisiana
Dec 30, 1999*		vs. No. 11 Oklahoma State	W 63–53	12–0	New Orleans Arena; New Orleans, Louisiana
Jan 5, 2000	No. 21	Alabama	W 78–66	13–0 (1–0)	Maravich Assembly Center; Baton Rouge, Louisiana
Jan 8, 2000	No. 21	No. 15 Tennessee	L 59–64	13–1 (1–1)	Maravich Assembly Center; Baton Rouge, Louisiana
Jan 12, 2000	No. 24	at No. 10 Florida	L 57–82	13–2 (1–2)	Stephen C. O'Connell Center; Gainesville, Florida
Jan 15, 2000	No. 24	at Vanderbilt	L 62–65	13–3 (1–3)	Memorial Gymnasium; Nashville, Tennessee
Jan 19, 2000		Georgia	W 61–57	14–3 (2–3)	Maravich Assembly Center; Baton Rouge, Louisiana
Jan 26, 2000		Arkansas	W 96–75	15–3 (3–3)	Maravich Assembly Center; Baton Rouge, Louisiana
Jan 29, 2000*		No. 5 Arizona	W 86–60	16–3	Maravich Assembly Center; Baton Rouge, Louisiana
Feb 2, 2000	No. 22	at Mississippi State	L 66–68	16–4 (3–4)	Humphrey Coliseum; Starkville, Mississippi
Feb 5, 2000	No. 22	at Alabama	W 93–60	17–4 (4–4)	Coleman Coliseum; Tuscaloosa, Alabama
Feb 9, 2000	No. 25	No. 9 Auburn	W 83–68	18–4 (5–4)	Maravich Assembly Center; Baton Rouge, Louisiana
Feb 13, 2000	No. 25	No. 11 Kentucky	W 70–57	19–4 (6–4)	Maravich Assembly Center; Baton Rouge, Louisiana
Feb 16, 2000	No. 16	at Ole Miss	W 97–53	20–4 (7–4)	Tad Smith Coliseum; Oxford, Mississippi
Feb 19, 2000	No. 16	at Arkansas	W 78–67	21–4 (8–4)	Bud Walton Arena; Fayetteville, Arkansas
Feb 23, 2000	No. 15	at South Carolina	W 64–59	22–4 (9–4)	Carolina Coliseum; Columbia, South Carolina
Feb 26, 2000	No. 15	Mississippi State	W 71–66	23–4 (10–4)	Maravich Assembly Center; Baton Rouge, Louisiana
Mar 1, 2000	No. 12	at No. 19 Auburn	W 55–53	24–4 (11–4)	Beard-Eaves-Memorial Coliseum; Auburn, Alabama
Mar 4, 2000	No. 12	Ole Miss	W 64–60	25–4 (12–4)	Maravich Assembly Center; Baton Rouge, Louisiana
SEC Tournament
Mar 10, 2000*	No. 10	vs. Vanderbilt	W 71–60	26–4	Georgia Dome; Atlanta, Georgia
Mar 11, 2000*	No. 10	vs. Arkansas	L 67–69	26–5	Georgia Dome; Atlanta, Georgia
NCAA Tournament
Mar 16, 2000*	(4 W) No. 10	vs. (13 W) Southeast Missouri State; First round	W 64–61	27–5	Jon M. Huntsman Center; Salt Lake City, Utah
Mar 18, 2000*	(4 W) No. 10	vs. (5 W) No. 15 Texas; Second Round	W 72–67	28–5	Jon M. Huntsman Center; Salt Lake City, Utah
Mar 23, 2000*	(4 W) No. 10	vs. (8 W) Wisconsin; West Regional semifinal – Sweet Sixteen	L 48–61	28–6	The Pit; Albuquerque, New Mexico
*Non-conference game. ^{#}Rankings from AP Poll, NCAA tournament seeds shown in parentheses. (#) Tournament seedings in parentheses. W=West. All times are in Central Standard Time.

== Rankings ==
Ranking movements Legend: ██ Increase in ranking ██ Decrease in ranking — = Not ranked
	Week																			
Poll	Pre	1	2	3	4	5	6	7	8	9	10	11	12	13	14	15	16	17	18	Final
AP	—	—	—	—	—	—	—	—	21	24	—	—	22	25	16	15	12	10	10	Not released
Coaches	—	—^	—	—	—	—	—	—	—	—	—	—	25	25	23	17	16	11	9	13

*AP does not release post-NCAA Tournament rankings
^Coaches did not release a Week 2 poll.

== NBA draft ==
Round	Pick	Player	NBA club
1	2	Stromile Swift	Vancouver Grizzlies
2	45	Jabari Smith	Sacramento Kings
