= 2001–02 George Mason Patriots men's basketball team =

American college basketball season

2001–02 George Mason Patriots men's basketball

NIT, Opening Round
- Conference: Colonial Athletic Association
- Record: 19-10 (13-5 CAA)
- Head coach: Jim Larrañaga (5th season)
- Assistant coaches: Scott Cherry; Bill Courtney; Mike Gillian
- Home arena: Patriot Center

2001–02 CAA men's basketball standings
	Conf.				Overall
Team	W		L	PCT	W		L	PCT
UNC Wilmington†	14	–	4	.778	23	–	10	.697
George Mason	13	–	5	.722	19	–	10	.655
VCU	11	–	7	.611	21	–	11	.656
Drexel	11	–	7	.611	14	–	14	.500
Delaware	9	–	9	.500	14	–	16	.467
Old Dominion	7	–	11	.389	13	–	16	.448
Towson	7	–	11	.389	11	–	18	.379
William & Mary	7	–	11	.389	10	–	19	.345
James Madison	6	–	12	.333	14	–	15	.483
Hofstra	5	–	13	.278	12	–	20	.375
† 2002 CAA tournament winner Rankings from AP poll

The 2001–02 George Mason Patriots Men's basketball team represented George Mason University during the 2001–02 NCAA Division I men's basketball season. This was the 36th season for the program, the fifth under head coach Jim Larrañaga. The Patriots played their home games at the Patriot Center in Fairfax, Virginia.

In the CAA tournament, the Patriots lost to Hofstra in the quarterfinals. They were invited to the NIT, where they lost to Saint Joseph's in the opening round.

== Honors and awards ==
Colonial Athletic Association All-Conference Team

- Jesse Young

Colonial Athletic Association All-Defensive Team

- Jon Larranaga

Colonial Athletic Association All-RookieTeam

- Lamar Butler

== Roster ==
2001–02 George Mason Patriots men's basketball team
Players
Coaches

Pos.	#	Name	Height	Weight	Year	Previous school	Hometown
G	1	Dereck Franklin	6 ft 0 in (1.83 m)	180 lb (82 kg)	Jr	Chantilly	Chantilly, VA
F	2	Jon Larranaga	6 ft 7 in (2.01 m)	230 lb (104 kg)	Jr	St. John's Catholic Prep	Oakton, VA
F	3	Jesse Young	6 ft 10 in (2.08 m)	250 lb (113 kg)	Jr	Peterborough Collegiate	Peterborough, Canada
G	4	Raoul Heinen	6 ft 5 in (1.96 m)	200 lb (91 kg)	So	Callant Lyceum	Bunschoten, Netherlands
G	5	Darren Tarver	6 ft 3 in (1.91 m)	215 lb (98 kg)	Jr	Buchtel / Wabash Valley CC	Akron, OH
G	12	Richard Tynes	6 ft 4 in (1.93 m)	205 lb (93 kg)	So	Hargrave Military Academy	Washington, DC
G	22	Lamar Butler	6 ft 2 in (1.88 m)	170 lb (77 kg)	Fr	Oxon Hill	Oxon Hill, MD
F	24	Rob Anderson	6 ft 5 in (1.96 m)	210 lb (95 kg)	Sr	Wakefield	Arlington, VA
C	33	Colin Wyatt	6 ft 9 in (2.06 m)	240 lb (109 kg)	Fr	Jamestown	Williamsburg, VA
F	34	Terrance Nixon	6 ft 6 in (1.98 m)	225 lb (102 kg)	Sr	Oxon Hill	Oxon Hill, MD
F	41	Deon Cooper	6 ft 9 in (2.06 m)	235 lb (107 kg)	So	Columbia Central	Columbia, TN

Head coach

- Jim Larrañaga (Providence)

Assistant coach(es)

- Scott Cherry (North Carolina)
- Bill Courtney (Bucknell)
- Mike Gillian (North Adams State)

Legend

- (C) Team captain
- (S) Suspended
- (I) Ineligible
- (W) Walk-on
- Injured
- Current redshirt

== Player statistics ==
Player	GP	GS	MPG	FG%	3FG%	FT%	RPG	APG	SPG	BPG	PPG
Darren Tarver	3	2	27.0	.553	.417	.500	3.0	1.7	0.7	0.0	18.0
Jesse Young	29	29	31.6	.484	.500	.714	8.4	1.4	1.0	1.0	14.6
Rob Anderson	29	29	30.7	.406	.375	.727	4.0	1.4	1.1	0.8	12.2
Jon Larranaga	29	29	31.0	.457	.400	.727	6.0	2.8	1.4	0.3	11.0
Lamar Butler	29	18	25.6	.368	.380	.819	2.5	1.9	1.1	0.1	10.4
Terrance Nixon	29	9	21.8	.424	.297	.800	3.5	0.8	0.5	0.5	7.6
Raoul Heinen	29	29	30.1	.420	.240	.628	4.0	4.6	1.4	0.2	7.2
Colin Wyatt	24	0	7.5	.629	.000	.286	1.2	0.2	0.5	0.0	2.0
Richard Tynes	29	0	8.8	.373	.222	.500	1.8	0.5	0.2	0.1	1.9
Deon Cooper	29	0	7.3	.476	.000	.800	0.9	0.2	0.2	0.2	0.8
Dereck Franklin	21	0	5.8	.286	.143	.444	0.4	0.5	0.1	0.0	0.7

== Schedule and results ==
Date time, TV	Rank^{#}	Opponent^{#}	Result	Record	High points	High rebounds	High assists	Site (attendance) city, state
Non-conference regular season
November 17, 2001*; 1:00 pm		at Niagara	W 86–71	1–0	29 – Tarver	10 – Young	6 – Larranaga	Gallagher Center (1,771); Lewiston, NY
November 19, 2001*; 7:00 pm		at Miami (OH)	L 65–70	1–1	20 – Anderson/Tarver	7 – Young	5 – Young	Millett Hall (3,087); Oxford, OH
November 24, 2001*; 7:30 pm		Toledo	W 67–64	2–1	15 – Anderson	11 – Larranaga	4 – Heinen	Patriot Center (3,342); Fairfax, VA
November 28, 2001*; 7:30 pm		Coppin State	W 80–44	3–1	14 – Nixon	9 – Larranaga	9 – Heinen	Patriot Center (1,910); Fairfax, VA
December 1, 2001*; 7:00 pm		at Ole Miss	W 71–70	4–1	23 – Anderson	7 – Anderson	11 – Heinen	Tad Smith Coliseum (4,235); Oxford, MS
December 5, 2001*; 7:00 pm		Central Michigan	W 65–54	5–1	15 – Anderson	7 – Young	4 – Heinen	Patriot Center (2,029); Fairfax, VA
December 8, 2001*; 4:30 pm		Southern Illinois	L 66–73	5–2	14 – Butler	8 – Larranaga	3 – Larranaga/Young	Patriot Center (3,114); Fairfax, VA
December 22, 2001; 7:00 pm		Delaware	L 56–83	5–3 (0–1)	12 – Nixon	5 – Larranaga	3 – Butler	Patriot Center (2,482); Fairfax, VA
December 28, 2001*; 6:00 pm		vs. Winthrop; Rogers AT&T NCAA Basketball Showcase	W 86–66	6–3	24 – Young	13 – Young	9 – Heinen	Halifax Metro Centre (5,486); Halifax, Nova Scotia
December 31, 2001*; 1:00 pm		at Duquesne	L 48–64	6–4	11 – Young	13 – Young	4 – Heinen	Palumbo Center (2,244); Pittsburgh, PA
CAA regular season
January 3, 2002; 7:00 pm		William & Mary	W 80–71	7–4 (1–1)	21 – Young	10 – Larranaga	3 – Heinen	Patriot Center (1,859); Fairfax, VA
January 5, 2002; 7:00 pm		Towson	W 71–42	8–4 (2–1)	20 – Larranaga	9 – Heinen	4 – Heinen	Patriot Center (3,066); Fairfax, VA
January 9, 2002; 7:00 pm		at UNC Wilmington	L 51–68	8–5 (2–2)	16 – Butler	10 – Young	4 – Heinen	Trask Coliseum (5,564); Wilmington, NC
January 12, 2002; 7:00 pm		Old Dominion	W 76–67	9–5 (3–2)	24 – Larranaga	12 – Young	5 – Heinen	Patriot Center (4,540); Fairfax, VA
January 14, 2002; 7:00pm		Hofstra	W 82–68	10–5 (4–2)	24 – Young	12 – Larranaga	5 – Heinen	Patriot Center (1,719); Fairfax, VA
January 19, 2002; 8:00 pm		Towson	W 64–52	11–5 (5–2)	20 – Butler	13 – Young	6 – Larranaga	Towson Center (546); Towson, MD
January 23, 2002; 7:30 pm		at VCU; Rivalry	L 59–75	11–6 (5–3)	26 – Young	11 – Young	3 – Heinen	Siegel Center (4,135); Richmond, VA
January 26, 2002; 1:00 pm		at Drexel	L 69–100	11–7 (5–4)	16 – Young	6 – Young	4 – Heinen	Daskalakis Athletic Center (2,027); Philadelphia, PA
February 2, 2002; 12:00 pm		James Madison	W 80–68	12–7 (6–4)	17 – Young	9 – Heinen	8 – Heinen	Patriot Center (6,499); Fairfax, VA
February 6, 2002; 7:30 pm		at Delaware	W 69–57	13–7 (7–4)	19 – Young	8 – Young	3 – Heinen	Bob Carpenter Center (4,908); Newark, DE
February 9, 2002; 4:00 pm		at Hofstra	W 62–61	14–7 (8–4)	13 – Young	9 – Young	2 – Butler/Heinen	Hofstra Arena (3,522); Hempstead, NY
February 11, 2002; 7:00 pm		UNC Wilmington	W 59–56	15–7 (9–4)	14 – Nixon	9 – Young	4 – Larranaga	Patriot Center (2,247); Fairfax, VA
February 16, 2002; 2:00 pm		Drexel	W 79–64	16–7 (10–4)	20 – Young	10 – Young	3 – Anderson/Heinen	Patriot Center (5,761); Fairfax, VA
February 18, 2002; 7:00 pm		at William & Mary	L 51–54	16–8 (10–5)	14 – Young	6 – Larranaga/Young	3 – Heinen	William & Mary Hall (2,007); Williamsburg, VA
February 20, 2002; 7:00 pm		VCU; Rivalry	W 83–80	17–8 (11–5)	21 – Larranaga	9 – Heinen/Larranaga	10 – Heinen	Patriot Center (2,558); Fairfax, VA
February 23, 2002; 7:00 pm		at James Madison	W 81–74	18–8 (12–5)	22 – Young	5 – Heinen/Larranaga/Young	6 – Larranaga	JMU Convocation Center (6,121); Harrisonburg, VA
February 25, 2002; 7:35 pm		at Old Dominion	W 78–63	19–8 (13–5)	25 – Anderson	13 – Young	8 – Larranaga	ODU Fieldhouse (3,406); Norfolk, VA
2002 CAA tournament
March 2, 2002; 6:00 pm	(2)	vs. (10) Hofstra; Quarterfinals	L 76–82	19–9	18 – Young	7 – Young	7 – Heinen	Richmond Coliseum (5,014); Richmond, VA
2002 NIT
March 12, 2002; 7:00 pm		Saint Joseph's; Opening Round	L 64–73	19–10	22 – Larranaga	8 – Young	4 – Tynes	Patriot Center (3,355); Fairfax, VA
*Non-conference game. ^{#}Rankings from AP Poll. (#) Tournament seedings in parentheses. All times are in Eastern Time.
