= 2001–02 UNC Wilmington Seahawks men's basketball team =

American college basketball season

2001–02 UNC Wilmington Seahawks men's basketball

CAA regular season and tournament champions

NCAA tournament, second round
- Conference: Colonial Athletic Association
- Record: 23–10 (14–4 CAA)
- Head coach: Jerry Wainwright (8th season)
- Assistant coach: Billy Donlon
- Home arena: Trask Coliseum

2001–02 CAA men's basketball standings
	Conf.				Overall
Team	W		L	PCT	W		L	PCT
UNC Wilmington†	14	–	4	.778	23	–	10	.697
George Mason	13	–	5	.722	19	–	10	.655
VCU	11	–	7	.611	21	–	11	.656
Drexel	11	–	7	.611	14	–	14	.500
Delaware	9	–	9	.500	14	–	16	.467
Old Dominion	7	–	11	.389	13	–	16	.448
Towson	7	–	11	.389	11	–	18	.379
William & Mary	7	–	11	.389	10	–	19	.345
James Madison	6	–	12	.333	14	–	15	.483
Hofstra	5	–	13	.278	12	–	20	.375
† 2002 CAA tournament winner Rankings from AP poll

The 2001–02 UNC Wilmington Seahawks men's basketball team represented the University of North Carolina Wilmington during the 2001–02 NCAA Division I men's basketball season. The Seahawks, led by eighth-year head coach Jerry Wainwright, played their home games at the Trask Coliseum and were members of the Colonial Athletic Association (CAA).

After finishing atop the CAA regular season standings, the Seahawks won the CAA tournament to receive an automatic bid to the NCAA tournament as No. 13 seed in the South region. After upsetting No. 4 seed USC in the opening round, UNC Wilmington lost to eventual National runner-up Indiana in the Round of 32. As of 2021, this is the farthest a UNC Wilmington men's basketball team has advanced in NCAA Tournament play.

In addition to the school's first NCAA Tournament win and win over a ranked opponent, junior shooting guard Brett Blizzard became the first player in program history to be named CAA Player of the Year and an AP Honorable Mention All-American.

== Roster ==
2001–02 UNC Wilmington Seahawks men's basketball team
Players	Coaches
Pos. / # / Name / Height / Weight / Year / Hometown; G / 11 / Brett Blizzard / 6 ft 4 in (1.93 m) / 195 lb (88 kg) / Jr / Tallahassee, Florida	Head coach: Jerry Wainwright; Assistant coach(es): Billy Donlon; Legend: (C) Team captain; (S) Suspended; (I) Ineligible; (W) Walk-on; Injured; Current redshirt; Roster

== Schedule and results ==
Date time, TV	Rank^{#}	Opponent^{#}	Result	Record	Site (attendance) city, state
Regular season
Nov 12, 2001*		at Wake Forest	L 78–79	0–1	Lawrence Joel Coliseum; Winston-Salem, North Carolina
Nov 17, 2001*		Miami (OH)	W 50–42	1–1	Trask Coliseum; Wilmington, North Carolina
Nov 24, 2001*		at High Point	W 74–66	2–1	Millis Center; High Point, North Carolina
Nov 26, 2001*		at Radford	L 72–85	2–2	Donald N. Dedmon Center; Radford, Virginia
Dec 2, 2001*		at Ohio State	L 54–80	2–3	Value City Arena; Columbus, Ohio
Dec 4, 2001*		at Minnesota	W 58–50	3–3	Williams Arena; Minneapolis, Minnesota
Dec 8, 2001*		Duquesne	W 64–52	4–3	Trask Coliseum; Wilmington, North Carolina
Dec 10, 2001*		at Bowling Green	L 83–84 ^{OT}	4–4	Anderson Arena; Bowling Green, Ohio
Dec 15, 2001*		College of Charleston	L 58–60	4–5	Trask Coliseum; Wilmington, North Carolina
Dec 21, 2001		at Old Dominion	W 71–67	5–5 (1–0)	ODU Fieldhouse; Norfolk, Virginia
Dec 28, 2001*		Fairfield	W 82–57	6–5	Trask Coliseum; Wilmington, North Carolina
Dec 30, 2001		Towson	W 76–37	7–5 (2–0)	Trask Coliseum; Wilmington, North Carolina
Jan 5, 2002		at Hofstra	W 69–58	8–5 (3–0)	Mack Sports Complex; Hempstead, New York
Jan 9, 2002		George Mason	W 68–51	9–5 (4–0)	Trask Coliseum; Wilmington, North Carolina
Jan 12, 2002		Delaware	L 60–65	9–6 (4–1)	Trask Coliseum; Wilmington, North Carolina
Jan 16, 2002		at William & Mary	W 58–56	10–6 (5–1)	Kaplan Arena; Williamsburg, Virginia
Jan 19, 2002		James Madison	W 63–59	11–6 (6–1)	Trask Coliseum; Wilmington, North Carolina
Jan 23, 2002		Old Dominion	W 66–56	12–6 (7–1)	Trask Coliseum; Wilmington, North Carolina
Jan 26, 2002		at VCU	L 68–74	12–7 (7–2)	Siegel Center; Richmond, Virginia
Jan 28, 2002		at Towson	W 56–46	13–7 (8–2)	Towson Center; Towson, Maryland
Feb 2, 2002		Hofstra	W 78–54	14–7 (9–2)	Trask Coliseum; Wilmington, North Carolina
Feb 4, 2002		Drexel	W 63–50	15–7 (10–2)	Trask Coliseum; Wilmington, North Carolina
Feb 9, 2002		at James Madison	W 69–61	16–7 (11–2)	JMU Convocation Center; Harrisonburg, Virginia
Feb 11, 2002		at George Mason	L 56–59	16–8 (11–3)	Patriot Center; Fairfax, Virginia
Feb 13, 2002		William & Mary	W 66–58	17–8 (12–3)	Trask Coliseum; Wilmington, North Carolina
Feb 16, 2002		at Delaware	W 69–66	18–8 (13–3)	Bob Carpenter Center; Newark, Delaware
Feb 18, 2002		at Drexel	L 65–68	18–9 (13–4)	Daskalakis Athletic Center; Philadelphia, Pennsylvania
Feb 23, 2002		VCU	W 73–62	19–9 (14–4)	Trask Coliseum; Wilmington, North Carolina
CAA tournament
Mar 2, 2002*	(1)	vs. (9) James Madison; Quarterfinals	W 78–62	20–9	Richmond Coliseum; Richmond, Virginia
Mar 3, 2002*	(1)	vs. (5) Delaware; Semifinals	W 69–54	21–9	Richmond Coliseum; Richmond, Virginia
Mar 4, 2002*	(1)	at (3) VCU; Championship	W 66–51	22–9	Richmond Coliseum (7,512); Richmond, Virginia
NCAA tournament
Mar 14, 2002*	(13 S)	vs. (4 S) No. 18 USC; First Round	W 93–89 ^{OT}	23–9	ARCO Arena; Sacramento, California
Mar 16, 2002*	(13 S)	vs. (5 S) Indiana; Second Round	L 67–76	23–10	ARCO Arena; Sacramento, California
*Non-conference game. ^{#}Rankings from AP poll. (#) Tournament seedings in parentheses. S=South. All times are in Eastern Time.

== Awards and honors ==
- Brett Blizzard – AP Honorable Mention All-American, CAA Player of the Year, CAA tournament MVP
