= 1999–2000 Arkansas Razorbacks men's basketball team =

American college basketball season

1999–2000 Arkansas Razorbacks men's basketball

SEC tournament champions

NCAA tournament, Round of 64
- Conference: Southeastern Conference
- West
- Record: 19–15 (7–9 SEC)
- Head coach: Nolan Richardson (15th season)
- Home arena: Bud Walton Arena

1999–2000 Southeastern Conference men's basketball standings
	Conf.				Overall
Team	W		L	PCT	W		L	PCT
East
No. 13 Florida	12	–	4	.750	29	–	8	.784
No. 11 Tennessee	12	–	4	.750	26	–	7	.788
No. 19 Kentucky	12	–	4	.750	23	–	10	.697
Vanderbilt	8	–	8	.500	19	–	11	.633
South Carolina	5	–	11	.313	15	–	17	.469
Georgia	3	–	13	.188	10	–	20	.333
West
No. 10 LSU	12	–	4	.750	28	–	6	.824
No. 24 Auburn	9	–	7	.563	24	–	10	.706
Arkansas †	7	–	9	.438	19	–	15	.559
Alabama	6	–	10	.375	13	–	16	.448
Ole Miss	5	–	11	.313	19	–	14	.576
Mississippi State	5	–	11	.313	14	–	16	.467
† 2000 SEC tournament winner Rankings from AP Poll

The 1999–2000 Arkansas Razorbacks men's basketball team represented the University of Arkansas in the 1999–2000 college basketball season. The head coach was Nolan Richardson, serving for his 15th year. The team played its home games in Bud Walton Arena in Fayetteville, Arkansas. Arkansas won its first ever SEC Tournament championship, earning the conferences automatic bid to the NCAA Tournament. Sophomore guard Brandon Dean was the SEC Tournament MVP. Freshman forward Joe Johnson was named to the SEC All-Freshman Team and was named the SEC Rookie of the Year. Arkansas lost to the Miami Hurricanes in the first round of the NCAA Tournament.
