= 2000 SEC men's basketball tournament =

Men's basketball tournament

- Classification: Division I
- Season: 1999–00
- Teams: 12
- Site: Georgia Dome; Atlanta, Georgia (USA)
- Champions: Arkansas (1st title)
- Winning coach: Nolan Richardson (1st title)
- MVP: Brandon Dean (Arkansas)
- Attendance: 208,785
- Television: Jefferson Pilot Sports (1st Round, Quarterfinals, Semifinals); CBS (Championship game)

1999–2000 Southeastern Conference men's basketball standings
	Conf.				Overall
Team	W		L	PCT	W		L	PCT
East
No. 13 Florida	12	–	4	.750	29	–	8	.784
No. 11 Tennessee	12	–	4	.750	26	–	7	.788
No. 19 Kentucky	12	–	4	.750	23	–	10	.697
Vanderbilt	8	–	8	.500	19	–	11	.633
South Carolina	5	–	11	.313	15	–	17	.469
Georgia	3	–	13	.188	10	–	20	.333
West
No. 10 LSU	12	–	4	.750	28	–	6	.824
No. 24 Auburn	9	–	7	.563	24	–	10	.706
Arkansas †	7	–	9	.438	19	–	15	.559
Alabama	6	–	10	.375	13	–	16	.448
Ole Miss	5	–	11	.313	19	–	14	.576
Mississippi State	5	–	11	.313	14	–	16	.467
† 2000 SEC tournament winner Rankings from AP Poll

The 2000 SEC men's basketball tournament took place on March 9–12, 2000 at the Georgia Dome in Atlanta, Georgia.

The Arkansas Razorbacks won the tournament and received the SEC's automatic bid to the NCAA tournament by defeating the Auburn Tigers in the championship game on March 12, 2000.

== Tournament notes ==
- The 2000 SEC Tournament marked the Arkansas Razorbacks men’s basketball team’s first ever tournament title since they won their sixth and final Southwest Conference men's basketball tournament title in 1991, when the Razorbacks competed in the Southwest Conference (Arkansas joined the SEC in 1992).

== Bracket ==
First round
W4	Alabama	59
E5	South Carolina	69
E3	#11 Florida	89
W6	Ole Miss	67
E4	Vanderbilt	76
W5	Mississippi State	53
W3	Arkansas	71
E6	Georgia	64

Second Round
E1	#8 Tennessee	68
E5	South Carolina	75
W2	Auburn	78
E3	#11 Florida	70
W1	#10 LSU	71
E4	Vanderbilt	60
E2	#16 Kentucky	72
W3	Arkansas	86

Semifinals
E5	South Carolina	72
W2	Auburn	77
W1	#10 LSU	67
W3	Arkansas	69

Championship game
W2	Auburn	67
W3	Arkansas	75

== Television coverage ==
Jefferson Pilot Sports, in its 14th season as the regional syndicated rightsholder of SEC Basketball, broadcast the first three rounds of the tournament. CBS broadcast the championship game for the fifth year in a row.

Network	Play-by-play announcer	Color analyst(s)	Sideline reporter(s)
JP Sports (opening round; quarterfinals and semifinals)	Tim Brando (Mississippi–Florida, opening round; Florida–Auburn; quarterfinals)	Joe Dean, Jr. (Mississippi–Florida, opening round; Florida–Auburn; quarterfinals)	
CBS (Championship game)	Dick Enberg	Bill Raftery	
