= 2000 CAA men's basketball tournament =

- Classification: Division I
- Season: 1999–00
- Teams: 9
- Site: Richmond Coliseum; Richmond, Virginia
- Champions: UNC Wilmington (1st title)
- Winning coach: Jerry Wainwright (1st title)
- MVP: Brett Blizzard (UNC-Wilmington)
- Television: ESPN

1999–2000 CAA men's basketball standings
| | Conf. | | | | Overall |
| Team | W | | L | PCT | W | | L | PCT |
|---|---|---|---|---|---|---|---|---|
| George Mason | 12 | – | 4 | .750 | 19 | – | 11 | .633 |
| James Madison | 12 | – | 4 | .750 | 20 | – | 9 | .690 |
| Richmond | 11 | – | 5 | .688 | 18 | – | 12 | .600 |
| UNC Wilmington † | 8 | – | 8 | .500 | 18 | – | 13 | .581 |
| VCU | 7 | – | 9 | .438 | 14 | – | 14 | .500 |
| Old Dominion | 6 | – | 10 | .375 | 11 | – | 19 | .367 |
| William & Mary | 6 | – | 10 | .375 | 11 | – | 17 | .393 |
| American | 5 | – | 11 | .313 | 11 | – | 18 | .379 |
| East Carolina | 5 | – | 11 | .313 | 10 | – | 18 | .357 |
† 2000 CAA tournament winner Rankings from AP Poll

The 2000 CAA men's basketball tournament was held March 3–6, 2000, at the Richmond Coliseum in Richmond, Virginia. The winner of the tournament was UNC Wilmington, who received an automatic bid to the 2000 NCAA Men's Division I Basketball Tournament.

== Bracket ==
First round Friday, March 3
8 | American | 74
9 | East Carolina | 54

Quarterfinals; Saturday, March 4
1 | George Mason | 75
8 | American | 58
4 | UNC Wilmington | 66
5 | VCU | 57
2 | James Madison | 83
7 | William & Mary | 73
3 | Richmond | 67
6 | Old Dominion | 55

Semifinals; Sunday, March 5
1 | George Mason | 56
4 | UNC Wilmington | 67
2 | James Madison | 65
3 | Richmond | 80

Final; Monday, March 6
4 | UNC Wilmington | 57
3 | Richmond | 47

== Honors ==
| CAA All-Tournament Team | Player | School |
|---|---|---|
| CAA All-Tournament Team | Brett Blizzard | UNC-Wilmington |
| CAA All-Tournament Team | Reggie Brown | Richmond |
| CAA All-Tournament Team | Erik Herring | George Mason |
| CAA All-Tournament Team | Raymond Perine | UNC-Wilmington |
| CAA All-Tournament Team | Jabari Outtz | James Madison |
| CAA All-Tournament Team | Greg Stevenson | Richmond |
