= 1999 CAA men's basketball tournament =

Basketball tournament held in Richmond, Virginia

- Classification: Division I
- Season: 1998–99
- Teams: 9
- Site: Richmond Coliseum; Richmond, Virginia
- Champions: George Mason (2nd title)
- Winning coach: Jim Larranaga (1st title)
- MVP: George Evans (George Mason)
- Television: ESPN

1998–99 CAA men's basketball standings
	Conf.				Overall
Team	W		L	PCT	W		L	PCT
George Mason †	13	–	3	.813	19	–	11	.633
Old Dominion	11	–	5	.688	25	–	9	.735
Richmond	10	–	6	.625	15	–	12	.556
James Madison	9	–	7	.563	16	–	11	.593
UNC Wilmington	9	–	7	.563	11	–	17	.393
VCU	8	–	8	.500	15	–	16	.484
East Carolina	7	–	9	.438	13	–	14	.481
William & Mary	3	–	13	.188	8	–	19	.296
American	2	–	14	.125	7	–	21	.250
† 1999 CAA tournament winner Rankings from AP Poll

The 1999 CAA men's basketball tournament was held February 25–28, 1999, at the Richmond Coliseum in Richmond, Virginia. The winner of the tournament was George Mason, who received an automatic bid to the 1999 NCAA Men's Division I Basketball Tournament.

== Bracket ==
First round Thursday, February 25
8	William & Mary	57
9	American	61

Quarterfinals; Friday, February 26
1	George Mason	73
9	American	48
4	James Madison	55
5	UNC Wilmington	61
2	Old Dominion	65**
7	East Carolina	62
3	Richmond	57
6	VCU	64

Semifinals; Saturday, February 27
1	George Mason	58*
5	UNC Wilmington	56
2	Old Dominion	66
6	VCU	49

Final; Sunday, February 28
1	George Mason	63
2	Old Dominion	58

== Honors ==
CAA All-Tournament Team	Player	School
CAA All-Tournament Team	George Evans	George Mason
CAA All-Tournament Team	Cal Bowdler	Old Dominion
CAA All-Tournament Team	Andre McCullum	Old Dominion
CAA All-Tournament Team	Jason Miskiri	George Mason
CAA All-Tournament Team	Stan Simmons	UNC-Wilmington
