= 1999–2000 Kentucky Wildcats men's basketball team =

1999–00 season of University of Kentucky men's basketball team

1999–2000 Kentucky Wildcats men's basketball
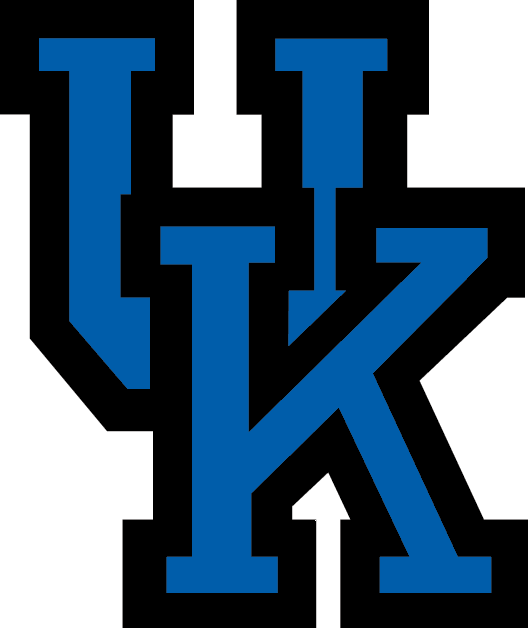

NCAA tournament, Round of 32
- Conference: Southeastern Conference

Ranking
- Coaches: No. 22
- AP: No. 19
- Record: 23–10 (12–4 SEC)
- Head coach: Tubby Smith (3rd season)
- Home arena: Rupp Arena

1999–2000 Southeastern Conference men's basketball standings
| | Conf. | | | | Overall |
| Team | W | | L | PCT | W | | L | PCT |
|---|---|---|---|---|---|---|---|---|
East
| No. 13 Florida | 12 | – | 4 | .750 | 29 | – | 8 | .784 |
| No. 11 Tennessee | 12 | – | 4 | .750 | 26 | – | 7 | .788 |
| No. 19 Kentucky | 12 | – | 4 | .750 | 23 | – | 10 | .697 |
| Vanderbilt | 8 | – | 8 | .500 | 19 | – | 11 | .633 |
| South Carolina | 5 | – | 11 | .313 | 15 | – | 17 | .469 |
| Georgia | 3 | – | 13 | .188 | 10 | – | 20 | .333 |
West
| No. 10 LSU | 12 | – | 4 | .750 | 28 | – | 6 | .824 |
| No. 24 Auburn | 9 | – | 7 | .563 | 24 | – | 10 | .706 |
| Arkansas † | 7 | – | 9 | .438 | 19 | – | 15 | .559 |
| Alabama | 6 | – | 10 | .375 | 13 | – | 16 | .448 |
| Ole Miss | 5 | – | 11 | .313 | 19 | – | 14 | .576 |
| Mississippi State | 5 | – | 11 | .313 | 14 | – | 16 | .467 |
† 2000 SEC tournament winner Rankings from AP Poll

The 1999–2000 Kentucky Wildcats men's basketball team represented University of Kentucky in the 1999–2000 NCAA Division I men's basketball season. The head coach was Tubby Smith and the team finished the season with an overall record of 23–10. In the 2000 NCAA Tournament Kentucky was invited as a #5 seed. After an opening round win vs St. Bonaventure, the Wildcats were bounced in the second round by Syracuse 52–50.
