= 2001–02 Drexel Dragons men's basketball team =

American college basketball season

2001–02 Drexel Dragons men's basketball
- Conference: Colonial Athletic Association
- Record: 14–14 (11–7 CAA)
- Head coach: Bruiser Flint (1st season)
- Assistant coaches: Geoff Arnold (1st season); Chuck Martin (1st season); Mike Connors (1st season)
- Home arena: Daskalakis Athletic Center

2001–02 CAA men's basketball standings
	Conf.				Overall
Team	W		L	PCT	W		L	PCT
UNC Wilmington†	14	–	4	.778	23	–	10	.697
George Mason	13	–	5	.722	19	–	10	.655
VCU	11	–	7	.611	21	–	11	.656
Drexel	11	–	7	.611	14	–	14	.500
Delaware	9	–	9	.500	14	–	16	.467
Old Dominion	7	–	11	.389	13	–	16	.448
Towson	7	–	11	.389	11	–	18	.379
William & Mary	7	–	11	.389	10	–	19	.345
James Madison	6	–	12	.333	14	–	15	.483
Hofstra	5	–	13	.278	12	–	20	.375
† 2002 CAA tournament winner Rankings from AP poll

The 2001–02 Drexel Dragons men's basketball team represented Drexel University during the 2001–02 NCAA Division I men's basketball season. The Dragons, led by 1st year head coach Bruiser Flint, played their home games at the Daskalakis Athletic Center and were members of the Colonial Athletic Association (CAA).

The team finished the season 14–14, and finished in 4th place in the CAA in the regular season. They were defeated by Delaware in the quarterfinals of the CAA tournament.

== Roster ==
2001–02 Drexel Dragons men's basketball team
Players
Coaches

Pos.	#	Name	Height	Weight	Year	Previous school	Hometown
F	23	Robert Battle	6 ft 8 in (2.03 m)	230 lb (104 kg)	Jr	Northeast HS	Philadelphia, PA
G	32	Phil Goss	6 ft 1 in (1.85 m)	175 lb (79 kg)	Fr	Oxon Hill HS	Temple Hills, MD
			—	—

Head coach

- Bruiser Flint (Saint Joseph's)

Assistant coach(es)

- Geoff Arnold (Saint Joseph's)
- Chuck Martin (South Carolina)
- Mike Connors (Ithaca)

Legend

- (C) Team captain
- (S) Suspended
- (I) Ineligible
- (W) Walk-on
- Injured
- Current redshirt

== Schedule ==
Date time, TV	Rank^{#}	Opponent^{#}	Result	Record	High points	High rebounds	High assists	Site (attendance) city, state
Regular season
November 16, 2001*		at Marist; Marist Pepsi Classic semifinal	L 67–75	0–1	–	–	–	McCann Arena (2,345); Poughkeepsie, NY
November 17, 2001*		vs. Northeastern; Marist Pepsi Classic 3rd place	W 87–67	1–1	–	–	–	McCann Arena (2,475); Poughkeepsie, NY
November 24, 2001*		at Rider	L 55–68	1–2	–	–	–	Alumni Gymnasium (1,260); Lawrenceville, NJ
November 28, 2001*		at Penn; Battle of 33rd Street	L 80–89	1–3	–	–	–	Palestra (3,281); Philadelphia, PA
December 1, 2001		at James Madison	W 71–58	2–3 (1–0)	–	–	–	JMU Convocation Center (3,630); Harrisonburg, VA
December 5, 2001*		Lafayette	L 84–88	2–4	–	–	–	Daskalakis Athletic Center (2,339); Philadelphia, PA
December 8, 2001*		vs. La Salle; City 6	L 70–80	2–5	–	–	–	Palestra (8,722); Philadelphia, PA
December 10, 2001*		at No. 16 Saint Joseph's	L 64–85	2–6	15 – Whitworth	–	–	Alumni Memorial Fieldhouse (3,200); Philadelphia, PA
December 18, 2001*		Northeastern	W 83–72	3–6	–	–	–	Daskalakis Athletic Center (1,017); Philadelphia, PA
December 23, 2001		Hofstra	W 70–58	4–6 (2–0)	–	–	–	Daskalakis Athletic Center (1,270); Philadelphia, PA
December 29, 2001*		Niagara	W 87–82	5–6	–	–	–	Daskalakis Athletic Center (1,231); Philadelphia, PA
CAA Regular season
January 3, 2002		Virginia Commonwealth	W 84–73	6–6 (3–0)	–	–	–	Daskalakis Athletic Center (2,098); Philadelphia, PA
January 5, 2002		at Old Dominion	L 66–74	6–7 (3–1)	–	–	–	(3,015)
January 26, 2002		George Mason	W 100–69		38 – Whitworth	–	–	Daskalakis Athletic Center (2,027); Philadelphia, PA
February 4, 2002		at UNC Wilmington	L 50–63		–	–	–	(5,179)
CAA tournament
March 2, 2002	(4)	vs. (5) Delaware; Quarterfinals	L 59–85	14–14	–	–	–	(3,580); Richmond, VA
*Non-conference game. ^{#}Rankings from AP. (#) Tournament seedings in parentheses. All times are in Eastern Time.

== Awards ==
Bruiser Flint

- CAA Coach Of The Year

Robert Battle

- CAA All-Conference First Team
- CAA Defensive Player of the Year
- CAA All-Defensive Team

Phil Goss

- CAA All-Rookie Team

Eric Schmieder

- CAA Player of the Week

Tim Whitworth

- CAA Player of the Week
