= 1999–2000 Tennessee Volunteers basketball team =

American college basketball season

1999–2000 Tennessee Volunteers basketball

SEC Regular season champions SEC East champions

NCAA tournament, Sweet Sixteen
- Conference: Southeastern Conference
- East

Ranking
- Coaches: No. 14
- AP: No. 11
- Record: 26–7 (12–4 SEC)
- Head coach: Jerry Green (3rd season)
- Home arena: Thompson–Boling Arena

1999–2000 Southeastern Conference men's basketball standings
	Conf.				Overall
Team	W		L	PCT	W		L	PCT
East
No. 13 Florida	12	–	4	.750	29	–	8	.784
No. 11 Tennessee	12	–	4	.750	26	–	7	.788
No. 19 Kentucky	12	–	4	.750	23	–	10	.697
Vanderbilt	8	–	8	.500	19	–	11	.633
South Carolina	5	–	11	.313	15	–	17	.469
Georgia	3	–	13	.188	10	–	20	.333
West
No. 10 LSU	12	–	4	.750	28	–	6	.824
No. 24 Auburn	9	–	7	.563	24	–	10	.706
Arkansas †	7	–	9	.438	19	–	15	.559
Alabama	6	–	10	.375	13	–	16	.448
Ole Miss	5	–	11	.313	19	–	14	.576
Mississippi State	5	–	11	.313	14	–	16	.467
† 2000 SEC tournament winner Rankings from AP Poll

The 1999–2000 Tennessee Volunteers basketball team represented the University of Tennessee during the 1999–2000 NCAA Division I men's basketball season. The team was led by third-year head coach Jerry Green, and played their home games at Thompson–Boling Arena in Knoxville, Tennessee as a member of the Southeastern Conference. After finishing as one of four SEC teams with a 12–4 conference record, they were invited to the NCAA tournament where they reached the Sweet Sixteen.

== Roster ==
1999–2000 Tennessee Volunteers men's basketball team
Players
Coaches

Pos.	#	Name	Height	Weight	Year	Previous school	Hometown
G	5	Harris Walker	6 ft 1 in (1.85 m)	—	Fr	Hargrave Military Academy	Chattanooga, Tennessee
F	12	Marcus Haislip	6 ft 10 in (2.08 m)	—	Fr	Marshall County	Lewisburg, Tennessee
G	14	Tony Harris	6 ft 0 in (1.83 m)	—	Jr	East	Memphis, Tennessee
F	22	Vincent Yarbrough	6 ft 7 in (2.01 m)	—	So	Cleveland	Cleveland, Tennessee
G	24	Jenis Grindstaff	6 ft 2 in (1.88 m)	—	So	-	Spruce Pine, North Carolina
G	31	Terrence Woods	6 ft 3 in (1.91 m)	—	Fr	Treadwell	Memphis, Tennessee
G	32	Del Baker	6 ft 5 in (1.96 m)	—	Jr	Cleveland	Cleveland, Tennessee
G	34	Vegas Davis	6 ft 3 in (1.91 m)	—	Sr	Parker	Parker, Arizona
F	35	Ron Slay	6 ft 8 in (2.03 m)	235 lb (107 kg)	Fr	Oak Hill Academy	Nashville, Tennessee
G	42	Jon Higgins	6 ft 3 in (1.91 m)	—	Fr	Shaker Heights	Shaker Heights, Ohio
F	43	C.J. Black	6 ft 8 in (2.03 m)	—	Sr	Brainerd	Chattanooga, Tennessee
F	44	Isiah Victor	6 ft 9 in (2.06 m)	—	Jr	University Heights	Hopkinsville, Kentucky
F	55	Charles Hathaway	6 ft 10 in (2.08 m)	—	Sr	Hillwood	Nashville, Tennessee

Head coach

- Jerry Green

Assistant coach(es)

Legend

- (C) Team captain
- (S) Suspended
- (I) Ineligible
- (W) Walk-on
- Injured
- Current redshirt

Roster

== Schedule and results ==
Date time, TV	Rank^{#}	Opponent^{#}	Result	Record	Site (attendance) city, state
Regular season
Nov 22, 1999*	No. 17	Elon	W 95–56	1–0	Thompson-Boling Arena; Knoxville, Tennessee
Nov 24, 1999*	No. 17	UNC Asheville	W 79–63	2–0	Thompson-Boling Arena; Knoxville, Tennessee
Nov 26, 1999*	No. 17	Long Island University	W 86–47	3–0	Thompson-Boling Arena; Knoxville, Tennessee
Nov 29, 1999*	No. 18	South Florida	W 102–90	4–0	Thompson-Boling Arena; Knoxville, Tennessee
Dec 1, 1999*	No. 18	Miami (OH)	W 78–59	5–0	Thompson-Boling Arena; Knoxville, Tennessee
Dec 4, 1999*	No. 18	at Pittsburgh	W 76–50	6–0	Fitzgerald Field House; Pittsburgh, Pennsylvania
Dec 8, 1999*	No. 16	West Virginia	W 94–54	7–0	Thompson-Boling Arena; Knoxville, Tennessee
Dec 10, 1999*	No. 16	Middle Tennessee	W 78–77	8–0	Thompson-Boling Arena; Knoxville, Tennessee
Dec 18, 1999*	No. 13	at Memphis	W 74–69	9–0	The Pyramid; Memphis, Tennessee
Dec 21, 1999*	No. 11	at American-Puerto Rico; Puerto Rico Holiday Classic	W 102–58	10–0	Eugene Guerra Sports Complex; San Juan, Puerto Rico
Dec 22, 1999*	No. 11	vs. Southern Illinois; Puerto Rico Holiday Classic	W 87–74	11–0	Eugene Guerra Sports Complex; San Juan, Puerto Rico
Dec 23, 1999*	No. 11	vs. Tulsa; Puerto Rico Holiday Classic	L 68–88	11–1	Eugene Guerra Sports Complex; San Juan, Puerto Rico
Jan 2, 2000*	No. 16	Radford	W 72–46	12–1	Thompson-Boling Arena; Knoxville, Tennessee
Jan 5, 2000	No. 15	at South Carolina	W 60–52	13–1 (1–0)	Carolina Coliseum; Columbia, South Carolina
Jan 8, 2000	No. 15	at No. 21 LSU	W 64–59	14–1 (2–0)	Maravich Assembly Center; Baton Rouge, Louisiana
Jan 12, 2000	No. 12	Vanderbilt	L 73–76	14–2 (2–1)	Thompson-Boling Arena; Knoxville, Tennessee
Jan 15, 2000	No. 12	Ole Miss	W 98–60	15–2 (3–1)	Thompson-Boling Arena; Knoxville, Tennessee
Jan 18, 2000	No. 16	at No. 9 Florida	W 81–79 ^{2OT}	16–2 (4–1)	Stephen C. O'Connell Center; Gainesville, Florida
Jan 25, 2000	No. 11	No. 7 Auburn	W 105–76	17–2 (5–1)	Thompson-Boling Arena; Knoxville, Tennessee
Jan 29, 2000	No. 11	South Carolina	W 73–66	18–2 (6–1)	Thompson-Boling Arena; Knoxville, Tennessee
Feb 1, 2000	No. 6	at No. 14 Kentucky	L 68–81	18–3 (6–2)	Rupp Arena; Lexington, Kentucky
Feb 6, 2000	No. 6	at Mississippi State	W 88–81	19–3 (7–2)	Humphrey Coliseum; Starkville, Mississippi
Feb 9, 2000	No. 8	Georgia	W 110–83	20–3 (8–2)	Thompson-Boling Arena; Knoxville, Tennessee
Feb 12, 2000	No. 8	No. 12 Florida	W 76–73 ^{OT}	21–3 (9–2)	Thompson-Boling Arena; Knoxville, Tennessee
Feb 19, 2000	No. 5	Vanderbilt	L 72–85	21–4 (9–3)	Thompson-Boling Arena; Knoxville, Tennessee
Feb 23, 2000	No. 7	No. 18 Kentucky	W 74–67	22–4 (10–3)	Thompson-Boling Arena; Knoxville, Tennessee
Feb 26, 2000	No. 7	at Alabama	L 75–80	22–5 (10–4)	Coleman Coliseum; Tuscaloosa, Alabama
Mar 1, 2000	No. 11	at Arkansas	W 73–66	23–5 (11–4)	Bud Walton Arena; Fayetteville, Arkansas
Mar 4, 2000	No. 11	at Georgia	W 83–66	24–5 (12–4)	Stegeman Coliseum; Athens, Georgia
SEC tournament
Mar 10, 2000*	No. 8	vs. South Carolina	L 68–75	24–6	Georgia Dome; Atlanta, Georgia
NCAA tournament
Mar 17, 2000*	(4 SE) No. 11	vs. (13 SE) Louisiana-Lafayette; First round	W 63–58	25–6	Birmingham-Jefferson Civic Center; Birmingham, Alabama
Mar 19, 2000*	(4 SE) No. 11	vs. (5 SE) No. 20 Connecticut; Second Round	W 65–51	26–6	Birmingham-Jefferson Civic Center; Birmingham, Alabama
Mar 24, 2000*	(4 SE) No. 11	vs. (8 SE) North Carolina; Southeast Regional semifinal – Sweet Sixteen	L 69–74	26–7	Frank Erwin Center; Austin, Texas
*Non-conference game. ^{#}Rankings from AP poll. (#) Tournament seedings in parentheses. SE=Southeast. All times are in Eastern Time.

== Rankings ==
Ranking movements Legend: ██ Increase in ranking ██ Decrease in ranking т = Tied with team above or below
	Week																			
Poll	Pre	1	2	3	4	5	6	7	8	9	10	11	12	13	14	15	16	17	18	Final
AP	19	19	17	18	16	13	11	16	15	12	16	11	6	8	5	7	11	8	11	Not released
Coaches	16	16^	18	18	15	12	12	13	13	12	14	13	9	9 т	6	7	10	8	10	14

*AP does not release post-NCAA Tournament rankings
^Coaches did not release a Week 2 poll.
