= 2001–02 William & Mary Tribe men's basketball team =

American college basketball season

2001–02 William & Mary Tribe men's basketball
- Conference: Colonial Athletic Association
- Record: 10–19 (7–11 CAA)
- Head coach: Rick Boyages (2nd season)
- Home arena: Kaplan Arena

2001–02 CAA men's basketball standings
	Conf.				Overall
Team	W		L	PCT	W		L	PCT
UNC Wilmington†	14	–	4	.778	23	–	10	.697
George Mason	13	–	5	.722	19	–	10	.655
VCU	11	–	7	.611	21	–	11	.656
Drexel	11	–	7	.611	14	–	14	.500
Delaware	9	–	9	.500	14	–	16	.467
Old Dominion	7	–	11	.389	13	–	16	.448
Towson	7	–	11	.389	11	–	18	.379
William & Mary	7	–	11	.389	10	–	19	.345
James Madison	6	–	12	.333	14	–	15	.483
Hofstra	5	–	13	.278	12	–	20	.375
† 2002 CAA tournament winner Rankings from AP poll

The 2001–02 William & Mary Tribe men's basketball team represented The College of William & Mary during the 2001–02 college basketball season. This was head coach Rick Boyages' second season at William & Mary. The Tribe competed in the Colonial Athletic Association and played their home games at Kaplan Arena. They finished the season 10–19, 7–11 in sixth place in CAA play and lost in the preliminary rounds of the 2002 CAA men's basketball tournament to James Madison. They did not participate in any post-season tournaments.
