= Jerry Wainwright =

American basketball coach

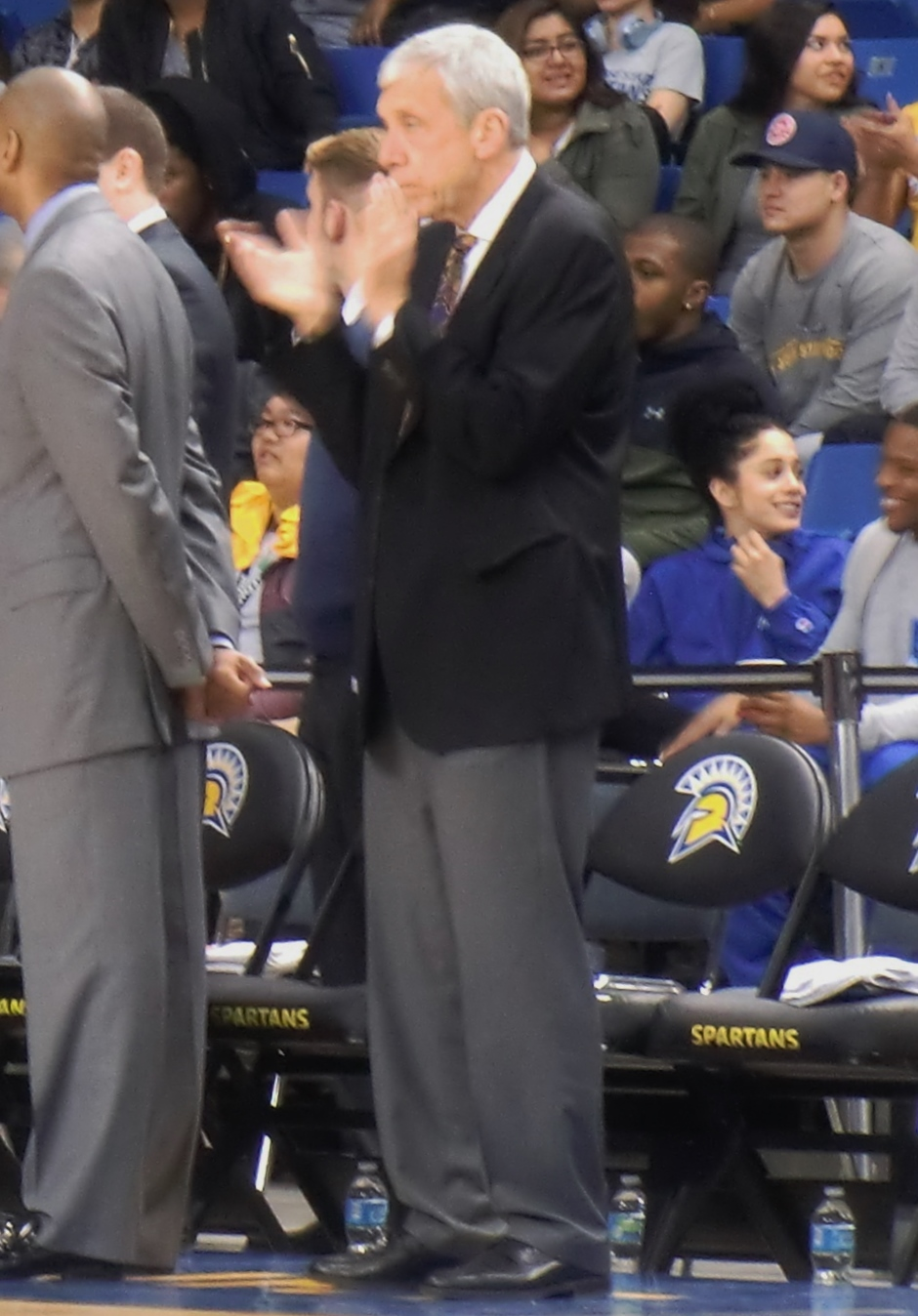
- Wainwright in 2016

Biographical details
- Born: February 11, 1947 (age 79); Berwyn, Illinois, U.S.

Playing career
- 1964–1966: Morton JC
- 1966–1968: Colorado College
- Position: Center

Coaching career (HC unless noted)
- 1971–1974: West Leyden HS (assistant)
- 1974–1975: Montrose HS
- 1975–1979: East Leyden HS (assistant)
- 1979–1984: Highland Park HS
- 1984–1985: Xavier (assistant)
- 1985–1994: Wake Forest (assistant)
- 1994–2002: UNC Wilmington
- 2002–2005: Richmond
- 2005–2010: DePaul
- 2011–2012: Fresno State (associate HC)
- 2012–2014: Marquette (assistant)
- 2014–2018: Fresno State (associate HC)
- 2019–2020: Tulsa (assistant)

Head coaching record
- Overall: 245–225 (college)
- Tournaments: 1–3 (NCAA Division I); 2–4 (NIT)

Accomplishments and honors

Championships
- 3 CAA regular season (1997, 1998, 2002); 2 CAA tournament (2000, 2002)

Awards
- 2× CAA Coach of the Year (1997, 2001)

Gerald Charles Wainwright Jr. (born February 11, 1947) is an American former basketball coach. Wainwright served as the head men's basketball coach at the University of North Carolina at Wilmington (UNC Wilmington) from 1994 to 2002, the University of Richmond from 2002 to 2005, and DePaul University from 2005 to 2010.

== Early life and education ==
Born in Berwyn, Illinois, Wainwright graduated from J. Sterling Morton High School West. He first attended Morton Junior College before transferring to Colorado College and played center for the Colorado College Tigers basketball team from 1966 to 1968. As a junior in 1966–67, Wainwright played in 19 games, shot 50% from the field, and averaged 10.9 points and 6.6 rebounds. In his senior season of 1967–68, Wainwright played 20 games, shot 45.6% from the field, and averaged 9.4 points and 6.3 rebounds. Wainwright completed his B.A. degree at Colorado College in 1968 and master's degree at the University of Denver in 1971.

== Coaching career ==
Wainwright began his coaching career in 1971 as assistant coach at West Leyden High School in Northlake, Illinois in 1971. Three years later, Wainwright returned to Colorado to be head coach at Montrose High School in Montrose, Colorado. After earning Colorado District Coach of the Year in 1975, Wainwright returned to his native Illinois and became an assistant coach at East Leyden High School in Franklin Park, Illinois near Chicago. After four seasons at East Leyden, Wainwright became head coach at Highland Park High School in 1979. At Highland Park, Wainwright earned two district "coach of the year" awards and led the program to the Sweet 16 round of the state tournament in 1982.

In 1984, Wainwright got his first college coaching job as an assistant coach at Xavier under Bob Staak. Wainwright then followed Staak to Wake Forest in 1985 and remained on Dave Odom's staff at Wake Forest until the 1993–94 season.

From 1994 to 2002, Wainwright was head coach at UNC Wilmington, during which he had a 136–103 record. In his final season with UNCW, he led the Seahawks to a first-round upset of USC in the 2002 NCAA tournament.

Wainwright then became head coach at Richmond on April 24, 2002. In a three-season tenure, led Richmond to an NIT appearance in 2003 and NCAA tournament appearance in 2004.

He was the head coach at DePaul from 2005 to 2010. On November 21, 2006, Wainwright earned his 200th win as a Division I head coach in a 93–74 victory over Chaminade at the Maui Invitational. DePaul ended the 2006–07 season with 20 wins and advanced to the NIT quarterfinals. After a 7–8 start, Wainwright was fired on January 11, 2010. Wainwright then left coaching to promote charity causes in North Carolina. In 2010 and 2011, Wainwright served as an in-studio analyst for SiriusXM's Mad Dog Radio's NCAA Tournament coverage with Chris "Mad Dog" Russo.

After one season as assistant coach under Rodney Terry at Fresno State, Wainwright became director of basketball operations at Marquette in June 2012 and was later promoted to assistant coach before the season. In 2014, Wainwright re-joined Fresno State as associate head coach, again under Terry.

== Head coaching record ==
=== College ===
Record table
Season	Team	Overall	Conference	Standing	Postseason
UNC Wilmington Seahawks (Colonial Athletic Association) (1994–2002)
1994–95	UNC Wilmington	16–11	10–4	2nd	
1995–96	UNC Wilmington	13–16	9–7	3rd	
1996–97	UNC Wilmington	16–14	10–6	T–1st	
1997–98	UNC Wilmington	20–11	13–3	T–1st	NIT First Round
1998–99	UNC Wilmington	11–17	9–7	T–4th	
1999–00	UNC Wilmington	18–13	8–8	4th	NCAA Division I First Round
2000–01	UNC Wilmington	19–11	11–5	T–2nd	NIT First Round
2001–02	UNC Wilmington	23–10	14–4	1st	NCAA Division I Second Round
UNC Wilmington:		136–103 (.569)	84–44 (.656)		
Richmond Spiders (Atlantic 10 Conference) (2002–2005)
2002–03	Richmond	16–14	9–7	T–3rd (West)	NIT Opening Round
2003–04	Richmond	20–13	10–6	T–3rd (West)	NCAA Division I First Round
2004–05	Richmond	14–15	8–8	4th (West)	
Richmond:		50–42 (.543)	27–21 (.563)		
DePaul Blue Demons (Big East Conference) (2005–2010)
2005–06	DePaul	12–15	5–11	T–13th	
2006–07	DePaul	20–14	9–7	T–7th	NIT Quarterfinal
2007–08	DePaul	11–19	6–12	T–12th	
2008–09	DePaul	9–24	0–18	16th	
2009–10	DePaul	7–8	0–3	(fired)	
DePaul:		59–80 (.424)	20–51 (.282)		
Total:		245–225 (.521)			
National champion Postseason invitational champion Conference regular season champion Conference regular season and conference tournament champion Division regular season champion Division regular season and conference tournament champion Conference tournament champion
