= 1998–99 George Mason Patriots men's basketball team =

American college basketball season

1998–99 George Mason Patriots men's basketball

CAA regular season and tournament champions

NCAA tournament, First Round
- Conference: Colonial Athletic Association
- Record: 19–11 (13–3 CAA)
- Head coach: Jim Larrañaga (2nd season)
- Assistant coaches: Derek Kellogg (2nd season); Bill Courtney (2nd season); Mike Gillian (2nd season)
- Home arena: Patriot Center (Capacity: 10,000)

1998–99 CAA men's basketball standings
	Conf.				Overall
Team	W		L	PCT	W		L	PCT
George Mason †	13	–	3	.813	19	–	11	.633
Old Dominion	11	–	5	.688	25	–	9	.735
Richmond	10	–	6	.625	15	–	12	.556
James Madison	9	–	7	.563	16	–	11	.593
UNC Wilmington	9	–	7	.563	11	–	17	.393
VCU	8	–	8	.500	15	–	16	.484
East Carolina	7	–	9	.438	13	–	14	.481
William & Mary	3	–	13	.188	8	–	19	.296
American	2	–	14	.125	7	–	21	.250
† 1999 CAA tournament winner Rankings from AP Poll

The 1998–99 George Mason Patriots Men's basketball team represented George Mason University during the 1998–99 NCAA Division I men's basketball season. This was the 33rd season for the program, the second under head coach Jim Larrañaga. The Patriots played their home games at the Patriot Center in Fairfax, Virginia.

== Honors and awards ==
Colonial Athletic Association Player of the Year

- George Evans

Colonial Athletic Association All-Conference Team

- George Evans
- Jason Miskiri

Colonial Athletic Association Defensive Player of the Year

- George Evans

Colonial Athletic Association Coach of the Year

- Jim Larrañaga

== Roster ==
1998–99 George Mason Patriots men's basketball team
Players
Coaches

Pos.	#	Name	Height	Weight	Year	Previous school	Hometown
C	3	Nik Mirich	6 ft 9 in (2.06 m)	230 lb (104 kg)	Sr	—	Canley Heights, Australia
G	5	Tremaine Price	5 ft 8 in (1.73 m)	150 lb (68 kg)	So	Parkdale	Landover, MD
G	11	Jason Miskiri	6 ft 2 in (1.88 m)	175 lb (79 kg)	Sr	Montgomery Blair / Montgomery Col.	Silver Spring, MD
G	20	Lee Brown	6 ft 1 in (1.85 m)	175 lb (79 kg)	Sr	Dundee-Crown / Kishwaukee Col.	Carpentersville, IL
F	21	George Evans	6 ft 7 in (2.01 m)	225 lb (102 kg)	So	I.C. Norcom	Portsmouth, VA
G	22	Ahmad Dorsett	6 ft 2 in (1.88 m)	180 lb (82 kg)	Jr	Woodbridge	Woodbridge, VA
F	23	Avery Carey	6 ft 5 in (1.96 m)	—	RS Sr	North Hagerstown / Hagerstown CC	Hagerstown, MD
F	24	Rob Anderson	6 ft 5 in (1.96 m)	210 lb (95 kg)	Fr	Wakefield	Arlington, VA
F	25	Quilninious Randall	6 ft 5 in (1.96 m)	215 lb (98 kg)	Fr	Thayer Academy	Boston, MA
F	33	Keith Holdan	6 ft 6 in (1.98 m)	205 lb (93 kg)	RS Jr	Apex / Campbell	Apex, NC
F	34	Terrance Nixon	6 ft 6 in (1.98 m)	225 lb (102 kg)	Fr	Oxon Hill	Oxon Hill, MD
F	40	Nsilo Abraham	6 ft 6 in (1.98 m)	225 lb (102 kg)	RS Sr	Kecoughtan / Loyola (MD)	Hampton, VA
G	44	Erik Herring	6 ft 5 in (1.96 m)	200 lb (91 kg)	So	Thornton	Chicago, IL

Head coach

- Jim Larrañaga (Providence)

Assistant coach(es)

- Bill Courtney (Bucknell)
- Mike Gillian (North Adams State)
- Derek Kellogg (Massachusetts)

Legend

- (C) Team captain
- (S) Suspended
- (I) Ineligible
- (W) Walk-on
- Injured
- Current redshirt

== Player statistics ==
Player	GP	FG%	3FG%	FT%	RPG	APG	SPG	BPG	PPG
George Evans	30	.557	.000	.547	8.5	2.1	2.1	2.6	17.2
Jason Miskiri	29	.399	.321	.612	4.3	3.9	2.0	0.2	15.8
Keith Holdan	30	.441	.368	.615	4.8	1.9	1.1	0.6	9.2
Erik Herring	29	.452	.439	.683	4.1	2.0	1.6	0.4	8.9
Ahmad Dorsett	30	.405	.375	.756	2.4	1.0	1.2	0.2	8.7
Tremaine Price	26	.506	.407	.560	1.3	1.6	0.9	0.1	4.0
Avery Carey	27	.414	.250	.571	1.9	0.3	0.3	0.1	3.6
Terrance Nixon	30	.447	.000	.722	1.7	0.2	0.2	0.2	3.0
Lee Brown	5	.444	.200	1.000	0.0	0.2	0.6	0.0	2.4
Nik Mirich	30	.523	.000	.588	2.2	0.4	0.3	0.1	1.9
Nsilo Abraham	19	.429	.000	.579	1.2	0.1	0.1	0.0	1.8
Quilninious Randall	23	.375	.000	.650	1.2	0.3	0.5	0.0	1.6
Rob Anderson	19	.412	.500	.000	0.5	0.1	0.2	0.2	0.8

== Schedule and results ==
Date time, TV	Rank^{#}	Opponent^{#}	Result	Record	High points	High rebounds	High assists	Site (attendance) city, state
Non-conference regular season
November 13, 1998*; 7:00 pm		at George Washington; Revolutionary Rivalry	L 59–71	0–1	23 – Evans	11 – Evans	5 – Holdan	Smith Center (5,121); Washington, DC
November 16, 1998*		at Villanova	L 76–86	0–2	24 – Evans	7 – Evans	7 – Miskiri	The Pavilion (6,500); Villanova, PA
November 20, 1998*		vs. Portland; AT&T Shootout	W 74–72	1–2	25 – Evans	9 – Evans	5 – Miskiri	Alumni Hall (250); Fairfield, CT
November 21, 1998*		at Fairfield; AT&T Shootout	L 91–93	1–3	23 – Evans	10 – Holdan	6 – Miskiri	Alumni Hall (2,179); Fairfield, CT
November 24, 1998*; 7:00 pm		Toledo	L 59–60	1–4	17 – Evans/Miskiri	15 – Evans	2 – Carey	Patriot Center (1,727); Fairfax, VA
November 28, 1998*; 7:00 pm		Penn State	L 60–74	1–5	17 – Holdan	14 – Evans	5 – Miskiri	Patriot Center (3,087); Fairfax, VA
December 1, 1998*; 7:00 pm		Howard	W 106–55	2–5	18 – Carey	10 – Herring	10 – Miskiri	Patriot Center (1,680); Fairfax, VA
December 5, 1998; 2:00 pm		at James Madison	W 83–81	3–5 (1–0)	17 – Evans	12 – Evans	4 – Evans/Miskiri	JMU Convocation Center (3,727); Harrisonburg, VA
December 12, 1998*; 7:15 pm		at College of Charleston	L 70–74	3–6	24 – Evans	8 – Evans	4 – Holdan	F. Mitchell Johnson Center (3,576); Charleston, SC
December 28, 1998*; 7:00 pm		Sacred Heart	W 88–63	4–6	19 – Miskiri	8 – Evans	4 – Miskiri	Patriot Center (1,717); Fairfax, VA
CAA regular season
January 2, 1999; 4:30 pm		William & Mary	W 78–67	5–6 (2–0)	21 – Evans/Miskiri	9 – Evans	6 – Miskiri	Patriot Center (2,228); Fairfax, VA
January 4, 1999; 7:00 pm		Old Dominion	W 83–53	6–6 (3–0)	20 – Miskiri	9 – Evans	4 – Miskiri	Patriot Center (1,804); Fairfax, VA
January 9, 1999; 4:30 pm		at American	W 65–55	7–6 (4–0)	22 – Miskiri	10 – Evans	4 – Miskiri	Bender Arena (4,196); Washington, DC
January 13, 1999; 7:00 pm		Richmond	W 78–52	8–6 (5–0)	32 – Miskiri	9 – Miskiri	4 – Evans	Patriot Center (2,339); Fairfax, VA
January 16, 1999; 7:30 pm		at UNC Wilmington	L 48–54	8–7 (5–1)	16 – Miskiri	9 – Holdan	3 – Miskiri	Trask Coliseum (4,172); Wilmington, NC
January 18, 1999; 7:00pm		at East Carolina	L 58–60	8–8 (5–2)	15 – Holdan	6 – Evans	8 – Miskiri	Minges Coliseum (3,967); Greenville, NC
January 20, 1999; 7:30 pm		VCU; Rivalry	W 77–68	9–8 (6–2)	19 – Evans	9 – Evans	7 – Herring	Patriot Center (2,215); Fairfax, VA
January 23, 1999*; 3:15 pm		at Bucknell	L 86–96 ^{2OT}	9–9	30 – Evans	9 – Evans	6 – Price	Davis Gym (1,910); Lewisburg, PA
January 27, 1999; 7:30 pm		at Richmond	L 73–79	9–10 (6–3)	21 – Evans	5 – Holdan	4 – Miskiri	Robins Center (4,621); Richmond, VA
January 30, 1999; 4:30 pm		James Madison	W 82–78	10–10 (7–3)	15 – Evans/Miskiri	9 – Evans	4 – Miskiri	Patriot Center (7,251); Fairfax, VA
February 6, 1999; 2:00 pm		at Old Dominion	W 79–73	11–10 (8–3)	22 – Miskiri	6 – Evans	6 – Miskiri	Norfolk Scope (4,078); Norfolk, VA
February 10, 1999; 7:00 pm		at William & Mary	W 82–70	12–10 (9–3)	22 – Miskiri	8 – Herring	4 – Evans	William & Mary Hall (2,961); Williamsburg, VA
February 13, 1999; 7:00 pm		UNC Wilmington	W 60–53	13–10 (10–3)	14 – Miskiri	10 – Evans	3 – Miskiri/Price	Patriot Center (5,556); Fairfax, VA
February 15, 1999; 7:00 pm		East Carolina	W 87–68	14–10 (11–3)	20 – Carey/Evans	8 – Evans/Holdan	5 – Miskiri	Patriot Center (2,745); Fairfax, VA
February 17, 1999; 7:00 pm		at VCU; Rivalry	W 89–73	15–10 (12–3)	22 – Dorsett	8 – Herring	4 – Evans	Robins Center (3,807); Richmond, VA
February 20, 1999; 4:30 pm		American	W 81–69	16–10 (13–3)	34 – Miskiri	14 – Evans	5 – Herring	Patriot Center (5,492); Fairfax, VA
1999 CAA tournament
February 26, 1999; 12:00 pm	(1)	vs. (9) American; Quarterfinals	W 73–48	17–10	25 – Evans	14 – Evans	4 – Dorsett/Miskiri	Richmond Coliseum (4,960); Richmond, VA
February 27, 1999; 6:00 pm	(1)	vs. (5) UNC Wilmington; Semifinals	W 58–56 ^{OT}	18–10	16 – Miskiri	14 – Evans	3 – Evans	Richmond Coliseum (6,832); Richmond, VA
February 28, 1999; 7:00 pm	(1)	vs. (2) Old Dominion; Championship	W 63–58	19–10	15 – Evans/Miskiri	7 – Evans/Holdan	4 – Price	Richmond Coliseum (7,097); Richmond, VA
1999 NCAA tournament
March 12, 1999; 2:00 pm	(14 E)	vs. (3 E) No. 11 Cincinnati; First Round	L 48–72	19–11	13 – Miskiri	7 – Holdan	3 – Evans/Miskiri	FleetCenter (18,884); Boston, MA
*Non-conference game. ^{#}Rankings from AP Poll. (#) Tournament seedings in parentheses. All times are in Eastern Time.
