= 2002 CAA men's basketball tournament =

- Classification: Division I
- Season: 2001–02
- Teams: 10
- Site: Richmond Coliseum; Richmond, Virginia
- Champions: UNC Wilmington (2nd title)
- Winning coach: Jerry Wainwright (2nd title)
- MVP: Brett Blizzard (UNC Wilmington)
- Television: ESPN

2001–02 CAA men's basketball standings
	Conf.				Overall
Team	W		L	PCT	W		L	PCT
UNC Wilmington†	14	–	4	.778	23	–	10	.697
George Mason	13	–	5	.722	19	–	10	.655
VCU	11	–	7	.611	21	–	11	.656
Drexel	11	–	7	.611	14	–	14	.500
Delaware	9	–	9	.500	14	–	16	.467
Old Dominion	7	–	11	.389	13	–	16	.448
Towson	7	–	11	.389	11	–	18	.379
William & Mary	7	–	11	.389	10	–	19	.345
James Madison	6	–	12	.333	14	–	15	.483
Hofstra	5	–	13	.278	12	–	20	.375
† 2002 CAA tournament winner Rankings from AP poll

The 2002 CAA men's basketball tournament was held from March 1–4, 2002 at the Richmond Coliseum in Richmond, Virginia. The winner of the tournament was UNC Wilmington, who received an automatic bid to the 2002 NCAA Men's Division I Basketball Tournament.

== Bracket ==
First round Friday, March 1
8	William & Mary	67
9	James Madison	78
7	Towson	52
10	Hofstra	72

Quarterfinals; Saturday, March 2
1	UNC Wilmington	78
9	James Madison	62
4	Drexel	59
5	Delaware	85
2	George Mason	76
10	Hofstra	82
3	VCU	58
6	Old Dominion	54

Semifinals; Sunday, March 3
1	UNC Wilmington	69
5	Delaware	54
10	Hofstra	54
3	VCU	70

Final; Monday, March 4
1	UNC Wilmington	66
3	VCU	51

== Honors ==
CAA All-Tournament Team	Player	School	Position
CAA All-Tournament Team	Brett Blizzard	UNC-Wilmington	Guard
CAA All-Tournament Team	Craig Callahan	UNC-Wilmington	Forward
CAA All-Tournament Team	Ed Williams	UNC-Wilmington	Forward
CAA All-Tournament Team	Domonic Jones	VCU	Guard
CAA All-Tournament Team	L. F. Likcholitov	VCU	Forward
CAA All-Tournament Team	Kenny Adeleke	Hofstra	Guard
