= 1999–2000 George Mason Patriots men's basketball team =

American college basketball season

1999–2000 George Mason Patriots men's basketball

CAA regular season co-champions
- Conference: Colonial Athletic Association
- Record: 19–11 (12–4 CAA)
- Head coach: Jim Larrañaga (3rd season)
- Assistant coaches: Scott Cherry; Bill Courtney; Mike Gillian
- Home arena: Patriot Center

1999–2000 CAA men's basketball standings
	Conf.				Overall
Team	W		L	PCT	W		L	PCT
George Mason	12	–	4	.750	19	–	11	.633
James Madison	12	–	4	.750	20	–	9	.690
Richmond	11	–	5	.688	18	–	12	.600
UNC Wilmington †	8	–	8	.500	18	–	13	.581
VCU	7	–	9	.438	14	–	14	.500
Old Dominion	6	–	10	.375	11	–	19	.367
William & Mary	6	–	10	.375	11	–	17	.393
American	5	–	11	.313	11	–	18	.379
East Carolina	5	–	11	.313	10	–	18	.357
† 2000 CAA tournament winner Rankings from AP Poll

The 1999–2000 George Mason Patriots Men's basketball team represented George Mason University during the 1999–2000 NCAA Division I men's basketball season. This was the 34th season for the program, the third under head coach Jim Larrañaga. The Patriots played their home games at the Patriot Center in Fairfax, Virginia.

== Honors and awards ==
Colonial Athletic Association Player of the Year

- George Evans

Colonial Athletic Association All-Conference Team

- George Evans
- Erik Herring (2nd team)

Colonial Athletic Association All-Defensive Team

- George Evans

Colonial Athletic Association Dean Ehlers Award

- Keith Holdan

== Roster ==
1999–2000 George Mason Patriots men's basketball team
Players
Coaches

Pos.	#	Name	Height	Weight	Year	Previous school	Hometown
F	3	Jesse Young	6 ft 10 in (2.08 m)	250 lb (113 kg)	Fr	Peterborough Collegiate	Peterborough, Canada
G	5	Tremaine Price	5 ft 8 in (1.73 m)	150 lb (68 kg)	Jr	Parkdale	Landover, MD
G	11	Tyrone Tiggs	6 ft 1 in (1.85 m)	175 lb (79 kg)	Fr	Malone	Two Egg, FL
F	21	George Evans	6 ft 7 in (2.01 m)	225 lb (102 kg)	Sr	I.C. Norcom	Portsmouth, VA
G	22	Ahmad Dorsett	6 ft 2 in (1.88 m)	180 lb (82 kg)	Sr	Woodbridge	Woodbridge, VA
F	24	Rob Anderson	6 ft 5 in (1.96 m)	210 lb (95 kg)	So	Wakefield	Arlington, VA
F	25	Quilninious Randall	6 ft 5 in (1.96 m)	215 lb (98 kg)	So	Thayer Academy	Boston, MA
F	31	Jon Larranaga	6 ft 7 in (2.01 m)	230 lb (104 kg)	Fr	St. John's Catholic Prep	Oakton, VA
F	33	Keith Holdan	6 ft 6 in (1.98 m)	205 lb (93 kg)	RS Sr	Apex / Campbell	Apex, NC
F	34	Terrance Nixon	6 ft 6 in (1.98 m)	225 lb (102 kg)	So	Oxon Hill	Oxon Hill, MD
G	44	Erik Herring	6 ft 5 in (1.96 m)	200 lb (91 kg)	Jr	Thornton	Chicago, IL

Head coach

- Jim Larrañaga (Providence)

Assistant coach(es)

- Scott Cherry (North Carolina)
- Bill Courtney (Bucknell)
- Mike Gillian (North Adams State)

Legend

- (C) Team captain
- (S) Suspended
- (I) Ineligible
- (W) Walk-on
- Injured
- Current redshirt

== Player statistics ==
Player	GP	FG%	3FG%	FT%	RPG	APG	SPG	BPG	PPG
George Evans	29	.583	.000	.539	8.5	2.3	1.9	1.7	18.1
Erik Herring	27	.466	.389	.719	3.1	2.9	1.1	0.4	13.6
Keith Holdan	30	.418	.388	.744	6.2	2.5	1.2	0.4	10.6
Ahmad Dorsett	28	.411	.387	.846	2.7	1.4	0.8	0.3	9.9
Tremaine Price	30	.389	.293	.655	2.5	2.9	1.2	0.1	6.4
Rob Anderson	30	.428	.289	.577	2.0	0.6	0.4	0.4	4.9
Jesse Young	30	.418	.100	.500	2.2	0.6	0.2	0.3	3.4
Terrance Nixon	27	.414	.000	.727	2.1	0.3	0.3	0.2	3.3
Tyrone Tiggs	26	.365	.056	.552	1.0	1.0	0.7	0.0	2.4
Jon Larranaga	26	.277	.125	.889	2.0	0.7	0.4	0.0	2.0
Quilninious Randall	8	.333	.000	.000	0.6	0.0	0.0	0.0	0.3

== Schedule and results ==
Date time, TV	Rank^{#}	Opponent^{#}	Result	Record	High points	High rebounds	High assists	Site (attendance) city, state
Non-conference regular season
November 19, 1999*; 7:00 pm		at Toledo	L 74–82	0–1	38 – Evans	12 – Evans	2 – Five Players	Savage Hall (6,957); Toledo, OH
November 23, 1999*; 7:30 pm		at Delaware	L 78–80	0–2	22 – Evans	8 – Evans	4 – Evans/Herring/Price	Bob Carpenter Center (5,000); Newark, DE
November 27, 1999*; 7:30 pm		Coppin State	W 69–66	1–2	17 – Herring	7 – Evans	5 – Holdan	Patriot Center (2,115); Fairfax, VA
December 4, 1999*; 7:30 pm		at Coastal Carolina	W 72–66	2–2	24 – Evans	13 – Evans	5 – Holdan/Price	Kimbel Arena (1,048); Conway, SC
December 8, 1999*; 7:00 pm		at Penn State	L 54–67	2–3	19 – Evans	7 – Evans	5 – Price	Bryce Jordan Center (7,708); University Park, PA
December 11, 1999*; 5:00 pm		vs. Rider; Conference Challenge	L 69–78	2–4	17 – Evans	8 – Herring	4 – Herring/Price	Retriever Activities Center (265); Cantonsville, MD
December 12, 1999*; 5:00 pm		at UMBC; Conference Challenge	W 63–62 ^{OT}	3–4	17 – Herring	13 – Evans	4 – Evans/Price	Retriever Activities Center (734); Cantonsville, MD
December 18, 1999; 4:30 pm		American	W 76–71	4–4 (1–0)	24 – Herring	7 – Holdan/Price	3 – Herring/Price	Patriot Center (2,128); Fairfax, VA
December 21, 1999*; 7:00 pm		Drexel	W 79–54	5–4	13 – Evans/Holdan/Young	6 – Larranaga	5 – Price	Patriot Center (1,555); Fairfax, VA
December 27, 1999*; 8:00 pm		at Maryland	L 66–69	5–5	17 – Evans	11 – Evans	5 – Holdan	Cole Field House (14,500); College Park, MD
January 3, 2000*; 7:00 pm		Bucknell	W 69–58	6–5	18 – Evans	7 – Evans	3 – Herring/Price	Patriot Center (1,833); Fairfax, VA
CAA regular season
January 5, 2000; 7:00 pm		at William & Mary	L 82–85 ^{OT}	6–6 (1–1)	29 – Evans	13 – Evans	3 – Four Players	William & Mary Hall (2,293); Williamsburg, VA
January 8, 2000; 7:30 pm		at James Madison	L 85–88	6–7 (1–2)	25 – Evans	15 – Evans	6 – Price	JMU Convocation Center (3,251); Harrisonburg, VA
January 10, 2000; 7:00 pm		UNC Wilmington	W 74–58	7–7 (2–2)	17 – Holdan	8 – Holdan	6 – Holdan	Patriot Center (1,650); Fairfax, VA
January 15, 2000; 7:00 pm		Old Dominion	W 77–75 ^{OT}	8–7 (3–2)	27 – Evans	9 – Evans	6 – Price	Patriot Center (3,989); Fairfax, VA
January 17, 2000; 7:00pm		East Carolina	W 75–66	9–7 (4–2)	22 – Evans	8 – Evans	4 – Evans	Patriot Center (1,847); Fairfax, VA
January 19, 2000*; 7:00 pm		Detroit	L 61–63	9–8	18 – Herring	6 – Nixon	6 – Herring	Patriot Center (1,769); Fairfax, VA
January 22, 2000; 7:30 pm		at VCU; Rivalry	W 76–63	10–8 (5–2)	23 – Herring	10 – Holdan	8 – Herring	Siegel Center (7,621); Richmond, VA
January 26, 2000; 7:30 pm		at Richmond	W 65–63	11–8 (6–2)	19 – Evans	6 – Holdan	3 – Herring/Holdan/Price	Robins Center (4,127); Richmond, VA
January 29, 2000; 7:00 pm		William & Mary	W 73–61	12–8 (7–2)	21 – Holdan	7 – Holdan	6 – Evans	Patriot Center (4,388); Fairfax, VA
February 2, 2000; 7:35 pm		at Old Dominion	L 64–75	12–9 (7–3)	21 – Evans	8 – Holdan	3 – Evans	Norfolk Scope (2,428); Norfolk, VA
February 5, 2000; 2:00 pm		at American	W 64–58	13–9 (8–3)	16 – Dorsett	9 – Evans/Holdan	4 – Evans/Price	Bender Arena (3,672); Washington, DC
February 7, 2000*; 7:00 pm		Fairfield	W 77–61	14–9	14 – Herring	10 – Holdan	4 – Herring/Tiggs	Patriot Center (1,682); Fairfax, VA
February 10, 2000; 7:00 pm		Richmond	W 73–65	15–9 (9–3)	20 – Herring	9 – Evans/Herring	4 – Evans/Price	Patriot Center (2,691); Fairfax, VA
February 16, 2000; 7:00 pm		VCU; Rivalry	W 87–86 ^{OT}	16–9 (10–3)	21 – Evans	11 – Evans	6 – Holdan	Patriot Center (2,409); Fairfax, VA
February 19, 2000; 7:30 pm		at UNC Wilmington	L 53–59	16–10 (10–4)	15 – Evans	10 – Holdan	6 – Price	Trask Coliseum (4,319); Wilmington, NC
February 21, 2000; 7:00 pm		at East Carolina	W 72–65	17–10 (11–4)	21 – Evans	6 – Larranaga	3 – Dorsett	Minges Coliseum (2,378); Greenville, NC
February 26, 2000; 4:30 pm		James Madison	W 76–64	18–10 (12–4)	17 – Evans	14 – Evans	5 – Evans	Patriot Center (9,676); Fairfax, VA
2000 CAA tournament
March 4, 2000; 12:00 pm	(1)	vs. (8) American; Quarterfinals	W 75–58	19–10	19 – Price	6 – Dorsett/Holdan	5 – Price	Richmond Coliseum (5,160); Richmond, VA
March 5, 2000; 3:30 pm	(1)	vs. (4) UNC Wilmington; Semifinals	L 56–67	19–11	15 – Dorsett	11 – Evans	5 – Evans	Richmond Coliseum (6,835); Richmond, VA
*Non-conference game. ^{#}Rankings from AP Poll. (#) Tournament seedings in parentheses. All times are in Eastern Time.
