= Jim Larrañaga =

American basketball coach (born 1949)

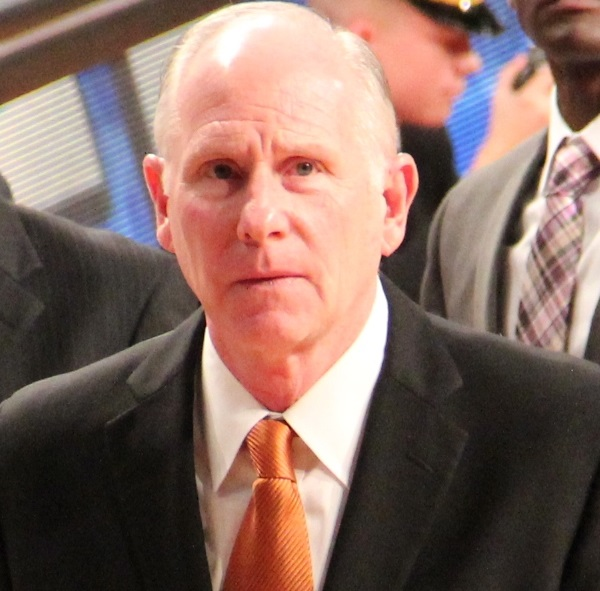
- Larrañaga in 2014

Biographical details
- Born: October 2, 1949 (age 77); Bronx, New York, U.S.

Playing career
- 1968–1971: Providence

Coaching career (HC unless noted)
- 1971–1976: Davidson (assistant)
- 1977–1979: American International
- 1979–1986: Virginia (assistant)
- 1986–1997: Bowling Green
- 1997–2011: George Mason
- 2011–2024: Miami (FL)

Head coaching record
- Overall: 744–505 (.596)
- Tournaments: 16–11 (NCAA Division I); 7–8 (NIT); 0–1 (CIT)

Accomplishments and honors

Championships
- 2× NCAA Division I regional — Final Four (2006, 2023); MAC regular season (1997); 4× CAA regular season (1999, 2000, 2006, 2011); 3× CAA tournament (1999, 2001, 2008); 2× ACC regular season (2013, 2023); ACC tournament (2013)

Awards
- Clair Bee Coach of the Year Award (2006); Adolph Rupp Cup (2013); AP College Coach of the Year (2013); Henry Iba Award (2013); Naismith College Coach of the Year (2013); MAC Coach of the Year (1997); 2× CAA Coach of the Year (1999, 2011); 2× ACC Coach of the Year (2013, 2016)

James Joseph Larrañaga Sr. (/ˌlɛərəˈneɪɡə/ LAIR-ə-NAY-gə; born October 2, 1949) is an American former college basketball coach. He was most recently the head coach of the University of Miami Hurricanes men's basketball team from 2011 to 2024 when he retired.

Before joining the University of Miami, Larrañaga was the head men's basketball coach at American International College from 1977 to 1979, Bowling Green State University from 1986 to 1997, and George Mason University from 1997 to 2011, where he coached the Patriots to 13 consecutive winning seasons and became a media sensation during the Patriots' improbable run to the Final Four in the 2005–06 season. In the 2022–23 season, he led the Miami Hurricanes to their first Final Four appearance in program history. The team then had two disappointing years, with Larrañaga resigning his position mid-season in December 2024.

Larrañaga has won several national coach of the year awards and retired with 744 wins in his career.

== Early life and education ==
Larrañaga is one of six children and grew up in the Parkchester section of the Bronx in New York City. Larrañaga's grandfather was born in Cuba to Basque parents and was part of Cuba's Por Larrañaga cigar company.

Larrañaga attended Archbishop Molloy High School in Queens, where he started on the varsity basketball team under coach Jack Curran and graduated in 1967.

He went on to play college basketball at Providence College in Providence, Rhode Island, where he was the team captain as a senior in the 1970–71 season and led the Friars to a 20–8 record and an NIT appearance. He graduated as fifth-highest scorer in school history with 1,258 career points, was the team's top scorer as a sophomore and junior, and was named New England's Division I Sophomore of the Year in 1969. In 1991, Larrañaga was inducted into the Providence College Hall of Fame. He graduated from Providence in 1971 with an economics degree and was selected in the sixth round of the 1971 NBA draft by the Detroit Pistons. He left the Pistons' rookie camp to take a coaching position at Davidson College after he was told he had slim chances of making the team.

== Coaching career ==
At Davidson, Larrañaga was an assistant coach to Terry Holland and also the freshman team coach. In his five years under Holland, Davidson won three regular season Southern Conference titles, reached the NIT once, and he amassed a 47–12 record as freshman coach. In 1976, he moved to Belgium in order to serve as player-coach for a professional club, but only stayed there for one season.

He returned to the U.S. in 1977 for his first head coaching job at American International College, a Division II program which had losing records in the previous five years. In two years at AIC, his teams had a 28–25 record, including a win against Northeastern University, whose team was coached by Jim Calhoun at that time. In 1979, he was reunited with his former Davidson mentor Holland, who by now had become the head coach at the University of Virginia. Larrañaga became an assistant at a program that had begun to emerge as a power in the ACC, arriving at the same time as highly touted freshman Ralph Sampson. In seven seasons at Virginia, Larrañaga was on the bench for an NIT title in 1980 and NCAA Final Four berths in 1981 and 1984.

=== Bowling Green ===
In 1986, Larrañaga left the University of Virginia for the head coaching job at Bowling Green State University. In his first season there, the Falcons improved by eight games over the 1985–86 season, finishing 15–14. He went on to record a 170–144 record in 11 years there, and was only the second coach in Bowling Green history to take the Falcons to postseason play in consecutive years (the 1990 and 1991 editions of the NIT). During his tenure at Bowling Green the Falcons defeated the perennial national powers Kentucky, Michigan State (twice), Ohio State, Penn State and Purdue. In his final season at Bowling Green in 1996–97, he led the Falcons to a regular-season co-championship in the Mid-American Conference as well as another NIT berth. He was also named the conference's Coach of the Year. Larrañaga is the second-winningest coach in Bowling Green school history, only behind Hall of Famer Harold Anderson). One notable NBA player who played for Larrañaga was guard Antonio Daniels, who was selected fourth overall in the 1997 draft.

=== George Mason ===
Larrañaga arrived at George Mason in 1997. His first team only went 9–18, but signs of improvement were present. In the 1998–99 season, the Patriots went 19–11, won the school's first Colonial Athletic Association regular-season title in history, and won the conference tournament to advance to the NCAA tournament. The Patriots would again go to the NCAA tournament in 2001 and two NITs in 2002 and 2004. The 2004 team was notable as Mason's first 20-win team in 14 years, and also won consecutive postseason games for the first time in school history.

==== 2004–05 season ====
The 2004–05 team, with three junior starters but dominated by freshmen and sophomores, went 16–13. However, these players would prove themselves the following season.

==== 2005–06: The dream season ====
The Patriots entered the 2005–06 season as a strong contender for the CAA title. They entered the conference tournament 22–6, finishing in a tie for the regular-season title with UNC Wilmington. Near the end of the regular season, they were briefly ranked in the Top 25 in the ESPN/USA Today poll, the school's first ranking ever, and were on the brink of making it to the Associated Press poll. They also narrowly lost to Wake Forest and Mississippi State, and survived a tough match at Wichita State in the ESPN-sponsored BracketBusters event.

However, from Mason's perspective, the CAA tournament would not live up to their expectations. The Patriots survived an overtime scare in the quarterfinals from Georgia State, and then lost to Hofstra in the semifinals. During that match, starting guard Tony Skinn hit a Hofstra player below the belt, earning a one-game suspension for his action. Many observers considered Mason to be "on the bubble" for an NCAA bid; some believed that Skinn's suspension would lead the NCAA Selection Committee to leave Mason out of the field. However, the committee put the Patriots in the field, making them the first at-large team from the CAA in 20 years. Some commentators, notably Billy Packer, criticized Mason's entry in the tournament.

The Patriots would enter the tournament as a No. 11 seed in the Washington, D.C. Regional, facing 2005 Final Four participant Michigan State. They pulled a 75–65 upset, giving Larrañaga and George Mason their first NCAA tournament victory ever. Next was a matchup against defending national champion North Carolina. Prior to the game, Larrañaga famously told his players: "Their fans think they're supermen. Our fans know we're kryptonite." The Patriots found themselves in a 16–2 hole, but climbed out of it to win 65–60 and advance to the regional site at the Verizon Center, about 30 minutes away from their Fairfax, Virginia campus.

The Patriots next won a rematch with Wichita State, controlling the game throughout and winning 63–55. That put them in the regional final against 2004 champions and regional top seed Connecticut. The Patriots trailed by as much as 12 during the first half, and by nine early in the second. However, they would storm back to make the game close the rest of the way. Larrañaga would motivate his team during timeouts by telling his players that the UConn players didn't know what conference George Mason was in. He told them that on this day "CAA" stood for "Connecticut Assassins Association." Mason would win 86–84 in overtime, becoming only the fourth team not from a BCS AQ conference to make the Final Four in a quarter-century (after UNLV in 1987 and 1991, Massachusetts in 1996 and Utah in 1998). Their improbable run ended on April 1 in Indianapolis when they lost 73–58 to eventual national champion Florida in the national semifinals.

Larrañaga received the Clair Bee Coach of the Year Award for his accomplishments during this season. Larrañaga's overall head coaching record going into the Final Four was 366–273.

==== 2010–11: The Revival ====
The 2010–2011 season brought great promise for the Patriots. Led by seniors Cam Long and Isiah Tate, the Patriots' campaign started off with mixed emotions as they dropped two games vs NC State and Wofford. From then, the Patriots sparked a seven-game winning streak including a key home win in the 'Battle of the Orange Line' versus George Washington University. The following four games proved to be a test as GMU traveled to the University of Dayton, played at home versus the University of Delaware, and away at both Hofstra University and at Old Dominion University. After the lowly spell of dropping three of those four, the Patriots became red hot as they went undefeated during the regular season winning 16 straight games including a crucial conference game at Virginia Commonwealth University. Heading into the CAA tournament, the ESPN/USA Today Coaches' Poll ranked George Mason as the number 25 team in the country, which was their first national ranking since 2006 when they made the improbable run to the Final Four. Senior Cam Long was voted first team all-conference and Coach Larrañaga was awarded the coach of the year. GMU would fall from the rankings after a semifinal loss to VCU in the conference tournament.

In the 2011 NCAA Tournament, Mason was assigned a No. 8 seed and faced off against No. 9 seed and Big East stalwart Villanova. In a seesaw game, Mason pulled out the victory when Luke Hancock knocked down a late three, and Mike Morrison threw down a last-second breakaway dunk. In the next round, Mason lost to No. 1 overall seed Ohio State.

=== University of Miami ===
==== 2011–2013 ====
On April 22, 2011, Larrañaga accepted the head coaching position at the University of Miami. In his first season with the Hurricanes in 2011–12, he led the team to a 9–7 record in-conference, which marked the university's first-ever winning record in the ACC. They finished with an overall record of 18–11 and were selected as a #2 seed in the 2012 National Invitation Tournament. The Hurricanes defeated Valparaiso in the first round but were defeated by Minnesota in the second round.

In his second season in 2012–13, Larrañaga led the Hurricanes to arguably their best season since the Rick Barry era, winning the ACC regular season title. It represented the first time in 11 years and only the fourth time in 32 years that a team not from North Carolina had won at least a share of the title. The highlight of the season was an unprecedented 90–63 rout of top-ranked Duke, which represented Miami's first-ever defeat of a top-ranked team and the largest margin of defeat for a top-ranked team ever. Following the regular season, Larrañaga was named 2012–13 ACC Coach of the Year. On March 17, 2013, Larrañaga coached the Hurricanes to its first ACC tournament title in the program's history with an 87–77 win over North Carolina. On April 4, 2013, Larrañaga was voted the Associated Press' college basketball coach of the year. A week later, the Hurricanes advanced to the Sweet Sixteen of the NCAA tournament with their school record 29th win. The season ended the following weekend with a loss to Marquette. Larrañaga claimed the Hurricanes had not enough energy to win the game because of Reggie Johnson's injury and Shane Larkin's sickness.

==== 2014–2018 ====
The Hurricanes started the 2014–15 season on an 8-game win streak, going 10–3 before the start of conference play. They would finish 6th in the ACC with an in-conference record of 10–8, and would defeat Virginia Tech but then lose to the eventual conference champion Notre Dame during the 2015 ACC tournament. For the second straight season since their Sweet Sixteen appearance, Miami would fail to qualify for the NCAA Tournament, but would instead be selected as a #2 seed in the 2015 National Invitation Tournament. The Hurricanes would go on a tightly contested 4-game run through the tournament defeating North Carolina Central, Alabama, Richmond, and Temple, before losing in the championship in overtime to Stanford.

During the 2015–16 season, Miami would once again improve their record, finishing 3rd in the ACC with a 13–5 conference record, going 24–6 overall. Larrañaga would be named ACC Coach of the Year for the second time. Despite not much success in the 2016 ACC tournament, the Hurricanes would qualify for the 2016 NCAA tournament for the first time since 2013 and would be selected as a #3 seed. They would go on to defeat Buffalo in the Round of 64 and Wichita State in the Round of 32, before being eliminated by the eventual champs Villanova in the Sweet Sixteen.

In 2016–17, the Hurricanes would once again start off strong with a 10–2 record prior to conference play. However, they would finish 9th in the ACC with a 10–8 conference record, 20–10 overall, which was enough to qualify for the 2017 NCAA tournament. Miami would lose in the Round of 64 to Michigan State 78–58.

In 2017–18, the Hurricanes were ranked #13 in the preseason AP Poll and started the season on a 10-game win streak. They would finish 3rd the ACC with a 11–7 conference record and 22–8 overall. Miami would lose the first game of the 2018 ACC tournament to North Carolina and a week later would be upset by Loyola-Chicago in the Round of 64 in the 2018 NCAA tournament.

==== 2018–2021 ====
From the 2018–19 season through 2020–21, the Hurricanes struggled to see success for the first time under Larrañaga. The 2018–19 season was Miami's first losing season under his tenure with an overall record of 14–18 and 5–13 in the ACC. The following season in 2019–20, the Hurricanes would only slightly improve to 15–16 overall and 7–13 in the ACC. The 2020–21 season would be Miami's worst during the Larrañaga era, where they would finish 10–17 overall and 4–15 in the ACC. The Hurricanes would also see the departure of five players during this season with it being reported they were unhappy with the program.

==== 2021–2024 ====
In 2021–22, the Hurricanes would drastically improve finishing 4th in the ACC at 14–6 and 22–9 overall. They would return to the NCAA tournament for the first time since 2018 and would be selected as a #10 seed. The Hurricanes defeated #7 USC in the Round of 64, upset #2 Auburn in the Round of 32, defeated #11 Iowa State in the Sweet Sixteen, before losing to #1 Kansas in their first Elite Eight appearance in program history.

The 2022–23 season would be Miami's best under Larrañaga and arguably their best in program history. The Hurricanes would become 2022–23 ACC regular season co-champions with Virginia at a 15–5 conference record and 24–6 overall. They would not see much success in the 2023 ACC tournament, losing to eventual champs Duke in their second game. Miami would be selected as a #5 seed in the 2023 NCAA tournament. The Hurricanes would go on a 4-game run defeating #12 Drake in the Round of 64, #4 Indiana in the Round of 32, #1 Houston in the Sweet Sixteen, and #2 Texas in the Elite Eight, advancing to their first Final Four appearance in program history, Larrañaga's second (2006). The Hurricanes would ultimately lose in the semifinal game to the eventual national champion UConn Huskies. The 2022–23 team would also tie their school record of 29 wins in a season (2012–13).

In 2023–24, the Hurricanes would regress finishing second to last in the ACC with a record of 6–14 and 15–16 overall. They would fail to qualify for the NCAA Tournament following two of their most successful seasons in school history.

The Hurricanes started the 2024–25 season on a 3-game non-conference win streak which would unknowingly be the highlight of the season. They would go 1–8 on the remaining games in 2024 before on December 26, Larrañaga unexpectedly announced his retirement from coaching and left the program. Larrañaga would finish his tenure at Miami with a 274–174 record, 6 NCAA Tournament appearances, 2 ACC Regular Season conference championships, and 1 ACC conference tournament championship. Larrañaga is the winningest coach in Miami Hurricanes Basketball history.

== Other achievements ==
In August 2007, Larrañaga was appointed as an associate professor in the George Mason University School of Management (SOM) in the school's Executive MBA program. Although his basketball schedule only allowed him to teach part-time, he was a frequent presenter in classes on leadership, management, and team development, and often spoke at school-sponsored seminars. He had been a guest lecturer at SOM since arriving at George Mason in 1997.

Larrañaga's 271 career wins at George Mason make him the winningest coach in the history of both the school and the CAA. He has won CAA Coach of the Year twice, in 1999 and in 2011. The latter award came after the Patriots reeled off a school-record 15 straight wins to finish the regular season, remaining undefeated at the Patriot Center, setting a school record for regular-season wins (25), and securing the No. 1 seed heading into the CAA tournament.

Larrañaga was inducted into the University of Miami Sports Hall of Fame & Museum at its 53rd Annual Induction Banquet on May 4, 2023.

== Personal life ==
Larrañaga is the father of James "Jay" Larranaga Jr., an assistant coach of the NBA's Los Angeles Clippers.

== Head coaching record ==
Record table
Season	Team	Overall	Conference	Standing	Postseason
American International Yellow Jackets (NCAA Division II independent) (1977–1979)
1977–78	American International	14–13			
1978–79	American International	14–12			
American International:		28–25 (.528)			
Bowling Green Falcons (Mid-American Conference) (1986–1997)
1986–87	Bowling Green	15–14	10–6	3rd	
1987–88	Bowling Green	12–16	7–9	T–5th	
1988–89	Bowling Green	13–15	7–9	T–6th	
1989–90	Bowling Green	18–11	9–7	T–3rd	NIT First Round
1990–91	Bowling Green	17–13	9–7	T–4th	NIT First Round
1991–92	Bowling Green	14–15	8–8	5th	
1992–93	Bowling Green	11–16	8–10	T–6th	
1993–94	Bowling Green	18–10	12–6	T–2nd	
1994–95	Bowling Green	16–11	10–8	T–5th	
1995–96	Bowling Green	14–13	9–9	T–6th	
1996–97	Bowling Green	22–10	13–5	T–1st	NIT First Round
Bowling Green:		170–144 (.541)	102–84 (.548)		
George Mason Patriots (Colonial Athletic Association) (1997–2011)
1997–98	George Mason	9–18	6–10	T–5th	
1998–99	George Mason	19–11	13–3	1st	NCAA Division I Round of 64
1999–00	George Mason	19–11	12–4	T–1st	
2000–01	George Mason	18–12	11–5	T–2nd	NCAA Division I Round of 64
2001–02	George Mason	19–10	13–5	2nd	NIT Opening Round
2002–03	George Mason	16–12	11–7	4th	
2003–04	George Mason	23–10	12–6	3rd	NIT Second Round
2004–05	George Mason	16–13	10–8	6th	
2005–06	George Mason	27–8	15–3	T–1st	NCAA Division I Final Four
2006–07	George Mason	18–15	9–9	T–5th	
2007–08	George Mason	23–11	12–6	3rd	NCAA Division I Round of 64
2008–09	George Mason	22–11	13–5	2nd	NIT First Round
2009–10	George Mason	17–15	12–6	4th	CIT First Round
2010–11	George Mason	27–7	16–2	1st	NCAA Division I Round of 32
George Mason:		273–164 (.625)	165–79 (.676)		
Miami Hurricanes (Atlantic Coast Conference) (2011–2024)
2011–12	Miami	20–13	9–7	T–4th	NIT Second Round
2012–13	Miami	29–7	15–3	1st	NCAA Division I Sweet 16
2013–14	Miami	17–16	7–11	10th	
2014–15	Miami	25–13	10–8	T–6th	NIT Runner-Up
2015–16	Miami	27–8	13–5	T–2nd	NCAA Division I Sweet 16
2016–17	Miami	21–12	10–8	T–7th	NCAA Division I Round of 64
2017–18	Miami	22–10	11–7	T–3rd	NCAA Division I Round of 64
2018–19	Miami	14–18	5–13	T–11th	
2019–20	Miami	15–16	7–13	T–10th	
2020–21	Miami	10–17	4–15	13th	
2021–22	Miami	26–11	14–6	4th	NCAA Division I Elite Eight
2022–23	Miami	29–8	15–5	T–1st	NCAA Division I Final Four
2023–24	Miami	15–17	6–14	14th	
2024–25	Miami	4–8	0–1		
Miami:		274–174 (.612)	126–116 (.521)		
Total:		745–507 (.595)			
National champion Postseason invitational champion Conference regular season champion Conference regular season and conference tournament champion Division regular season champion Division regular season and conference tournament champion Conference tournament champion

== See also ==
- List of college men's basketball coaches with 600 wins
- List of NCAA Division I Men's Final Four appearances by coach
