= 1999–2000 Florida Gators men's basketball team =

American college basketball season

1999–2000 Florida Gators men's basketball

NCAA tournament, Runner-up SEC Regular Season Co-Champions and Eastern Division champions

National Championship Game, L 76–89 vs. Michigan State
- Conference: Southeastern Conference
- East

Ranking
- Coaches: No. 2
- AP: No. 13
- Record: 29–8 (12–4 SEC)
- Head coach: Billy Donovan (4th season)
- Assistant coach: John Pelphrey; Anthony Grant; Donnie Jones
- Home arena: O'Connell Center

1999–2000 Southeastern Conference men's basketball standings
	Conf.				Overall
Team	W		L	PCT	W		L	PCT
East
No. 13 Florida	12	–	4	.750	29	–	8	.784
No. 11 Tennessee	12	–	4	.750	26	–	7	.788
No. 19 Kentucky	12	–	4	.750	23	–	10	.697
Vanderbilt	8	–	8	.500	19	–	11	.633
South Carolina	5	–	11	.313	15	–	17	.469
Georgia	3	–	13	.188	10	–	20	.333
West
No. 10 LSU	12	–	4	.750	28	–	6	.824
No. 24 Auburn	9	–	7	.563	24	–	10	.706
Arkansas †	7	–	9	.438	19	–	15	.559
Alabama	6	–	10	.375	13	–	16	.448
Ole Miss	5	–	11	.313	19	–	14	.576
Mississippi State	5	–	11	.313	14	–	16	.467
† 2000 SEC tournament winner Rankings from AP Poll

The 1999–2000 Florida Gators men's basketball team represented the University of Florida in the sport of basketball during the 1999–2000 college basketball season. The Gators competed in Division I of the National Collegiate Athletic Association (NCAA) and the Eastern Division of the Southeastern Conference (SEC). They were led by head coach Billy Donovan, and played their home games in the O'Connell Center on the university's Gainesville, Florida, campus.

The Gators were the SEC regular season champions, winning a share of the title with a 12–4 conference record. They earned a five seed in the 2000 NCAA tournament where they advanced to the Final Four and then made the school's first ever appearance in the NCAA championship game where they lost to Michigan State, 89–76. Florida ended the season No. 2 in the final USA Today/ESPN Rankings and were ranked wire-to-wire for the first time in school history.

== Roster ==
1999–2000 Florida Gators men's basketball team
Players
Coaches

Pos.	#	Name	Height	Weight	Year	Previous school	Hometown
F	15	Matt Bonner	6 ft 10 in (2.08 m)	237 lb (108 kg)	Fr	Concord H.S.	Concord, New Hampshire
F	33	Adriel Davis (W)	6 ft 5 in (1.96 m)	221 lb (100 kg)	Fr	James Rickards	Tallahassee, Florida
G	5	Teddy Dupay	5 ft 11 in (1.8 m)	178 lb (81 kg)	So	Mariner	Fort Myers, Florida
F	23	LaDarius Halton (injured) (redshirt)	6 ft 4 in (1.93 m)	200 lb (91 kg)	So	New Smyrna Beach H.S.	New Smyrna Beach, Florida
G	12	Justin Hamilton	6 ft 3 in (1.91 m)	207 lb (94 kg)	Fr	Booker H.S.	Sarasota, Florida
F	4	Donnell Harvey	6 ft 8 in (2.03 m)	216 lb (98 kg)	Fr	Randolph-Clay	Shellman, Georgia
C	50	Udonis Haslem	6 ft 7 in (2.01 m)	240 lb (109 kg)	So	Miami Senior High	Miami, Florida
G	2	Ronnie King (W)	5 ft 11 in (1.8 m)	170 lb (77 kg)	So	Armwood	Brandon, Florida
G	20	David Kliewer (W)	6 ft 2 in (1.88 m)	175 lb (79 kg)	So	Tarpon Springs H.S.	Tarpon Springs, Florida
G/F	13	Mike Miller	6 ft 8 in (2.03 m)	210 lb (95 kg)	So	Mitchell H.S.	Mitchell, South Dakota
G	10	Brett Nelson	6 ft 4 in (1.93 m)	182 lb (83 kg)	Fr	St. Albans H.S.	St. Albans, West Virginia
F	25	Major Parker (C)	6 ft 4 in (1.93 m)	218 lb (99 kg)	Jr	Cardinal Gibbons	Fort Lauderdale, Florida
G	52	Kenyan Weaks (C)	6 ft 4 in (1.93 m)	198 lb (90 kg)	Sr	Fork Union	Concord, North Carolina
F	00	Brent Wright (C)	6 ft 9 in (2.06 m)	235 lb (107 kg)	Jr	Miami Senior High	Miami, Florida

Head coach

- Billy Donovan (Providence)

Assistant coach(es)

- John Pelphrey (Kentucky)
- Anthony Grant (Dayton)
- Donnie Jones (Pikeville)

Legend

- (C) Team captain
- (S) Suspended
- (I) Ineligible
- (W) Walk-on
- Injured
- Current redshirt

Roster

== Schedule and results ==
Date time, TV	Rank^{#}	Opponent^{#}	Result	Record	High points	High rebounds	High assists	Site (attendance) city, state
Non–Conference Regular Season
November 19, 1999*	No. 7	Florida State; Sunshine Showdown	W 96–61	1–0	18 – Haslem	10 – Haslem	5 – Miller	Stephen C. O'Connell Center (12,487); Gainesville, Florida
November 22, 1999*	No. 6	vs. Utah State; Maui Invitational – First Round	W 60–58	2–0	19 – Weaks	6 – Harvey	5 – Miller	Lahaina Civic Center (2,400); Maui, Hawai'i
November 23, 1999*; 7:00 pm, ESPN	No. 6	vs. No. 22 Purdue; Maui Invitational – Semifinals	L 68–79	2–1	16 – Miller	9 – Harvey	4 – Weaks	Lahaina Civic Center (2,400); Maui, Hawai'i
November 24, 1999*	No. 6	vs. Georgetown; Maui Invitational – 3rd Place Game	W 72–62	3–1	18 – Miller	9 – Tied	4 – Weaks	Lahaina Civic Center (2,400); Maui, Hawai'i
November 29, 1999*	No. 11	New Hampshire	W 131–72	4–1	19 – Miller	12 – Miller	6 – Harvey	Stephen C. O'Connell Center (8,114); Gainesville, Florida
December 4, 1999*	No. 11	Florida A&M	W 96–44	5–1	23 – Weaks	9 – Harvey	5 – Nelson	Stephen C. O'Connell Center (7,476); Gainesville, Florida
December 11, 1999*	No. 9	Bethune–Cookman	W 93–77	6–1	18 – Weaks	10 – Tied	4 – Tied	Stephen C. O'Connell Center (7,312); Gainesville, Florida
December 19, 1999*	No. 9	High Point	W 109–60	7–1	20 – Miller	15 – Harvey	8 – Tied	Stephen C. O'Connell Center; Gainesville, Florida
December 21, 1999*; 9:00 pm, ESPN	No. 8	vs. Rutgers; Jimmy V Classic	W 85–65	8–1	16 – Tied	7 – Wright	6 – Weaks	Continental Airlines Arena (15,608); East Rutherford, New Jersey
December 23, 1999*	No. 8	UNC Wilmington	W 80–53	9–1	20 – Tied	7 – Harvey	5 – Tied	Stephen C. O'Connell Center (7,776); Gainesville, Florida
December 28, 1999*	No. 6	VMI	W 113–68	10–1	22 – Harvey	10 – Harvey	5 – Tied	Stephen C. O'Connell Center (7,122); Gainesville, Florida
December 30, 1999*	No. 6	South Alabama	W 82–61	11–1	17 – Weaks	9 – Harvey	5 – Weaks	Stephen C. O'Connell Center (7,157); Gainesville, Florida
SEC Regular Season
January 5, 2000	No. 6	at Vanderbilt	L 77–87	11–2 (0–1)	18 – Miller	7 – Miller	3 – Tied	Memorial Gymnasium (12,490); Nashville, Tennessee
January 8, 2000	No. 6	at Ole Miss	W 75–71	12–2 (1–1)	21 – Haslem	8 – Haslem	5 – Miller	Tad Smith Coliseum (7,691); Oxford, Mississippi
January 12, 2000	No. 10	No. 24 LSU	W 82–57	13–2 (2–1)	14 – Nelson	7 – Harvey	6 – Dupay	Stephen C. O'Connell Center (12,002); Gainesville, Florida
January 18, 2000; 9:00 pm, ESPN	No. 9	No. 16 Tennessee	L 79–81 ^{2OT}	13–3 (2–2)	19 – Harvey	12 – Harvey	4 – Miller	Stephen C. O'Connell Center (11,872); Gainesville, Florida
January 22, 2000	No. 9	at Alabama	W 77–73	14–3 (3–2)	25 – Miller	9 – Miller	6 – Dupay	Coleman Coliseum (9,507); Tuscaloosa, Alabama
January 26, 2000*; 9:00 pm, ESPN	No. 10	at DePaul	L 69–71	14–4	22 – Miller	9 – Haslem	4 – Nelson	Allstate Arena (10,515); Rosemont, Illinois
January 29, 2000	No. 10	No. 20 Vanderbilt	W 89–63	15–4 (4–2)	13 – Miller	9 – Miller	5 – Weaks	Stephen C. O'Connell Center (11,329); Gainesville, Florida
February 2, 2000	No. 12	at South Carolina	W 86–82	16–4 (5–2)	22 – Weaks	8 – Miller	6 – Miller	Carolina Coliseum (8,804); Columbia, South Carolina
February 5, 2000	No. 12	Georgia	W 85–66	17–4 (6–2)	17 – Nelson	10 – Haslem	3 – Tied	Stephen C. O'Connell Center (11,105); Gainesville, Florida
February 8, 2000; 9:00 pm, ESPN2	No. 12	No. 11 Kentucky	W 90–73	18–4 (7–2)	14 – Dupay	18 – Miller	4 – Harvey	Stephen C. O'Connell Center (11,818); Gainesville, Florida
February 12, 2000	No. 12	at No. 8 Tennessee	L 73–76 ^{OT}	18–5 (7–3)	24 – Haslem	9 – Harvey	3 – Tied	Thompson-Boling Arena (22,141); Knoxville, Tennessee
February 15, 2000; 9:00 pm, ESPN	No. 11	at Arkansas	W 80–71	19–5 (8–3)	19 – Miller	8 – Miller	5 – Tied	Bud Walton Arena (19,134); Fayetteville, Arkansas
February 19, 2000	No. 11	Mississippi State	W 88–58	20–5 (9–3)	21 – Dupay	8 – Miller	4 – Nelson	Stephen C. O'Connell Center (11,156); Gainesville, Florida
February 23, 2000	No. 9	at Georgia	W 90–68	21–5 (10–3)	25 – Miller	5 – Tied	4 – Nelson	Stegeman Coliseum (8,015); Athens, Georgia
February 27, 2000; 12:00 pm, CBS	No. 9	No. 11 Auburn	W 88–59	22–5 (11–3)	15 – Harvey	12 – Harvey	6 – Nelson	Stephen C. O'Connell Center (12,457); Gainesville, Florida
March 1, 2000	No. 8	South Carolina	W 87–67	23–5 (12–3)	15 – Miller	6 – Harvey	6 – Miller	Stephen C. O'Connell Center (11,005); Gainesville, Florida
March 4, 2000; 12:00 pm, CBS	No. 8	at No. 22 Kentucky	L 70–85	23–6 (12–4)	20 – Miller	8 – Bonner	3 – Dupay	Rupp Arena (23,916); Lexington, Kentucky
SEC Tournament
March 9, 2000*; 7:30 pm, JP Sports	(3 E) No. 11	vs. (6 W) Ole Miss	W 89–67	24–6	18 – Weaks	12 – Harvey	5 – Nelson	Georgia Dome; Atlanta, Georgia
March 10, 2000*; 7:30 pm, JP Sports	(3 E) No. 11	vs. (2 W) Auburn	L 70–78	24–7	15 – Harvey	11 – Miller	5 – Weaks	Georgia Dome; Atlanta, Georgia
NCAA Tournament
March 17, 2000*; 2:37 pm, CBS	(5 E) No. 13	vs. (12 E) Butler; First Round	W 69–68 ^{OT}	25–7	16 – Miller	13 – Miller	3 – Wright	Lawrence Joel Veterans Memorial Coliseum (14,252); Winston-Salem, North Carolina
March 19, 2000*; 2:30 pm, CBS	(5 E) No. 13	vs. (4 E) No. 21 Illinois; Second Round	W 93–76	26–7	19 – Miller	9 – Miller	4 – Nelson	Lawrence Joel Veterans Memorial Coliseum (14,252); Winston-Salem, North Carolina
March 24, 2000*; 7:28 pm, CBS	(5 E) No. 13	vs. (1 E) No. 1 Duke; Sweet Sixteen	W 87–78	27–7	15 – Nelson	9 – Miller	4 – Tied	Carrier Dome (30,163); Syracuse, New York
March 26, 2000*; 5:00 PM, CBS	(5 E) No. 13	vs. (3 E) No. 14 Oklahoma State; Elite Eight	W 77–65	28–7	14 – Miller	6 – Harvey	4 – Nelson	Carrier Dome (30,388); Syracuse, New York
April 1, 2000*; 8:18 pm, CBS	(5 E) No. 13	vs. (8 S) North Carolina; Final Four	W 71–59	29–7	13 – Nelson	7 – Tied	4 – Nelson	RCA Dome (43,116); Indianapolis, Indiana
April 3, 2000*; 9:18 pm, CBS	(5 E) No. 13	vs. (1 MW) No. 2 Michigan State; National Championship Game	L 76–89	29–8	27 – Haslem	10 – Wright	4 – Wright	RCA Dome (43,116); Indianapolis, Indiana
*Non-conference game. ^{#}Rankings from AP Poll.. (#) Tournament seedings in parentheses. All times are in Eastern Time. E = East, W = West, S = South, MW = Mid-West.

== NBA draft ==
Round	Overall	Player	NBA club
1	5	Mike Miller	Orlando Magic
1	22	Donnell Harvey	New York Knicks
