= Paul Westphal =

American basketball player and coach (1950–2021)

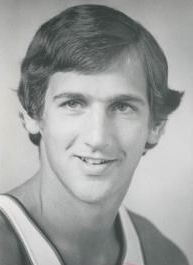
- Westphal with the Phoenix Suns in 1975

Personal information
- Born: November 30, 1950 Torrance, California, U.S.
- Died: January 2, 2021 (aged 70) Scottsdale, Arizona, U.S.
- Listed height: 6 ft 4 in (1.93 m)
- Listed weight: 195 lb (88 kg)

Career information
- High school: Aviation (Redondo Beach, California)
- College: USC (1969–1972)
- NBA draft: 1972: 1st round, 10th overall pick
- Drafted by: Boston Celtics
- Playing career: 1972–1984
- Position: Shooting guard / point guard
- Number: 44
- Coaching career: 1985–2016

Career history

Playing
- 1972–1975: Boston Celtics
- 1975–1980: Phoenix Suns
- 1980–1981: Seattle SuperSonics
- 1982–1983: New York Knicks
- 1983–1984: Phoenix Suns

Coaching
- 1985–1986: Southwestern Baptist Bible
- 1986–1988: Grand Canyon
- 1988–1992: Phoenix Suns (assistant)
- 1992–1995: Phoenix Suns
- 1998–2000: Seattle SuperSonics
- 2001–2006: Pepperdine
- 2007–2008: Dallas Mavericks (assistant)
- 2009–2012: Sacramento Kings
- 2014–2016: Brooklyn Nets (assistant)

Career highlights
- As player: NBA champion (1974); 5× NBA All-Star (1977–1981); 3× All-NBA First Team (1977, 1979, 1980); All-NBA Second Team (1978); NBA Comeback Player of the Year (1983); No. 44 retired by Phoenix Suns; Second-team All-American – AP (1971); Second-team All-American – NABC (1972); Third-team All-American – NABC (1971); 2× Third-team All-American – UPI (1971, 1972); 2× First-team All-Pac-8 (1970, 1971); Second-team All-Pac-8 (1972); No. 25 retired by USC Trojans; National high school player of the year (1968); California Mr. Basketball (1968); As coach: 2× NBA All-Star Game head coach (1993, 1995); NAIA champion (1988); WCC regular season champion (2002)

Career playing statistics
- Points: 12,809 (15.6 ppg)
- Assists: 3,591 (4.4 apg)
- Steals: 1,022 (1.3 spg)
- Stats at NBA.com
- Stats at Basketball Reference

Career coaching record
- NBA: 318–279 (.533)
- College: 159–98 (.619)
- Record at Basketball Reference
- Basketball Hall of Fame
- Collegiate Basketball Hall of Fame

Paul Douglas Westphal (November 30, 1950 – January 2, 2021) was an American basketball player and coach.

Westphal played in the National Basketball Association (NBA) from 1972 to 1984. Playing the guard position, he won an NBA championship with the Boston Celtics in 1974. Westphal played in the NBA Finals again in 1976 as a member of the Phoenix Suns, in a loss to the Celtics. His NBA career also included stints with the Seattle SuperSonics and the New York Knicks. In addition to being a five-time All-Star selection, Westphal earned three All-NBA First Team selections and one Second Team honor.

After his playing career ended, Westphal coached for Southwestern Baptist Bible College (now Arizona Christian University), Grand Canyon University, and Pepperdine University, and served also as head coach of the Phoenix Suns, Seattle SuperSonics, and Sacramento Kings in the NBA. Westphal coached the Suns to the NBA Finals in 1993.

In 2019, Westphal was inducted into the Naismith Memorial Basketball Hall of Fame.

== Early life ==
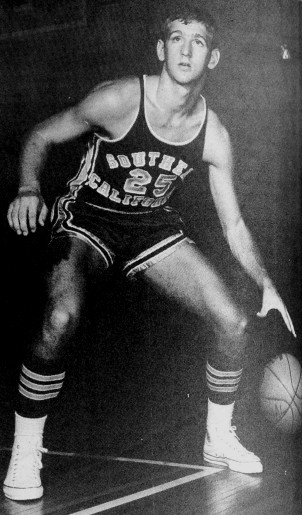
Westphal with USC

Born in Torrance, California, Westphal went to Aviation High School in Redondo Beach from 1966 to 1969. He attended the University of Southern California in Los Angeles and played college basketball for the Trojans at guard.

USC had a 24–2 (.923) record in 1971, setting a Trojans record for winning percentage. In that era, the Pac-8 Conference sent only one team (champion UCLA) to the 25-team NCAA tournament and none to the 16-team National Invitation Tournament (NIT).

Westphal was an All-American team captain in 1972. Playing for USC from 1970 to 1972, he averaged 16.9 points per game and led the Trojans with 20.3 points per game in 1972.

== Playing career ==
=== Boston Celtics (1972–1975) ===
The Boston Celtics selected Westphal tenth overall in the 1972 NBA draft. After three seasons in Boston, including a championship in 1974, the Celtics traded Westphal and two second round draft picks to the Phoenix Suns for Charlie Scott.

=== Phoenix Suns (1975–1980) ===
In his first season with Phoenix, Westphal helped the Suns reach their first NBA Finals, against the Celtics. In Game 5 of that series, often called "the greatest game ever played" in NBA history, he made several critical plays that pushed the game into triple overtime before Boston prevailed. Notably, Westphal exploited a loophole within NBA rules that effectively allowed the Suns to cede a point to get the ball at half-court with two seconds remaining at the end of the second overtime; the Suns tied the game thanks to the loophole.

Westphal was sixth in the NBA in scoring average for the 1977–78 season at 25.2 points per game, and was also the first NBA All-Star Weekend H-O-R-S-E Competition champion. The following season, he was seventh in scoring average with 24.0 points per game.

=== Seattle Supersonics (1980–1981) ===
After the 1979–80 season in early June, the Suns traded Westphal to the Seattle SuperSonics for Dennis Johnson, He played 36 games in the 1980–81 season, limited by a stress fracture in his right foot. He was a free agent after the season, but Seattle held the right of first refusal. He was unable to come to terms with the Sonics.

=== New York Knicks (1982–1983) ===
After missing most of the 1981–82 season, Westphal signed with the New York Knicks in late February 1982 after Seattle declined to match the offer. He was named the NBA Comeback Player of the Year in 1982–83, when he averaged 10 points and 5.5 assists and helped the Knicks qualify for the playoffs.

=== Return to Phoenix (1983–1984) ===
He signed a two-year contract with Phoenix in September 1983, and the Suns waived him in October 1984.

In his NBA career, Westphal scored a total of 12,809 points for an average of 15.6 points per game, with 3,591 assists for an average of 4.4 assists per game. He also had 1,580 rebounds, for an average of 1.9 per game. Westphal was a five-time All-Star, a three-time All-NBA first team selection, and a one-time second team All-NBA selection. He is Phoenix's fifth all-time leading scorer (9,564), averaging 20.6 points in six seasons (1975–80, 1983–84). His No. 44 was retired by the Suns, and he is a member of their Ring of Honor. Westphal was also inducted into the Naismith Basketball Hall of Fame as a player on September 6, 2019.

== Coaching career ==
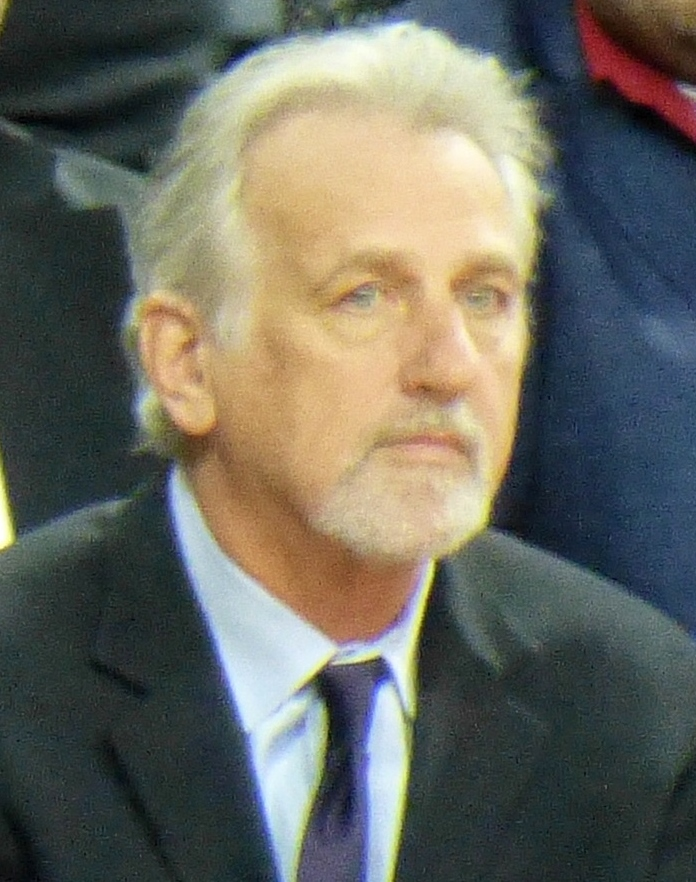
Westphal in 2014

Westphal's coaching career started in 1985 at Southwestern Baptist Bible College (now Arizona Christian University), located in Phoenix. After compiling a 21–9 record in his lone season there, he moved on to Grand Canyon College, also in Phoenix, and after two seasons led them to the NAIA national title in 1988.

In 1988, after three years in the college ranks, Westphal became an assistant coach with the Phoenix Suns under head coach Cotton Fitzsimmons, and in 1992, he succeeded Fitzsimmons as head coach of the Suns. With players such as Kevin Johnson, Dan Majerle, rookie Richard Dumas, Charles Barkley, and Danny Ainge, the Suns made it to the NBA Finals in Westphal's first season as a coach, but lost to the Chicago Bulls in six games. While the Suns made the playoffs during each of Westphal's seasons as coach, they did not return to the Finals, and Westphal was let go during the 1995–96 season. He served as an assistant coach for a high school team in Arizona for two years before he returned to the NBA as a coach with the SuperSonics for the 1998–99 season. He coached in Seattle until he was fired 15 games into the 2000–01 season.

Westphal returned to the college ranks in April 2001 at Pepperdine University. In his first season, Westphal led the Waves to a 22–9 record and tied the nationally ranked Gonzaga Bulldogs for the WCC title. The team received an at-large berth to the NCAA tournament, but lost 83–74 to Wake Forest in the first round, played at ARCO Arena in Sacramento. This was the only postseason berth during the rest of Westphal's five-year tenure and he finished with an overall record of 74–72. After a 7–20 season in 2005–06, Westphal was fired on March 15, 2006.

On June 28, 2007, the Dallas Mavericks announced they had hired Westphal as an assistant coach under head coach Avery Johnson. When Johnson was replaced by Rick Carlisle, Westphal left coaching to become executive vice-president of basketball operations (under Donnie Nelson) for the Mavericks in October 2008. On June 10, 2009, Westphal was named head coach of the Sacramento Kings. Westphal was fired from the Kings on January 5, 2012.

For the 2014–15 season, Westphal was hired by the Brooklyn Nets as an assistant to new head coach Lionel Hollins. Hollins had previously served as Westphal's assistant coach in Phoenix. When the Nets fired Hollins in January 2016, Westphal left the team.

== Broadcasting career ==
Westphal also worked as a studio analyst for Fox Sports Net West/Prime Ticket for Los Angeles Clippers and Los Angeles Lakers games, first joining them during the Clippers' run in the 2006 NBA Playoffs.

== NBA player statistics ==
Legend
GP	Games played	GS	Games started	MPG	Minutes per game
FG%	Field goal percentage	3P%	3-point field goal percentage	FT%	Free throw percentage
RPG	Rebounds per game	APG	Assists per game	SPG	Steals per game
BPG	Blocks per game	PPG	Points per game	**Bold**	Career high
†	Won an NBA championship	*	Led the league

=== Regular season ===
Year	Team	GP	GS	MPG	FG%	3P%	FT%	RPG	APG	SPG	BPG	PPG
1972–73	Boston	60	—	8.0	.420	—	.779	1.1	1.2	—	—	4.1
1973–74†	Boston	**82**	—	14.2	.501	—	.732	1.7	2.1	.5	.4	7.2
1974–75	Boston	**82**	—	19.3	.510	—	.763	2.0	2.9	1.0	.4	9.8
1975–76	Phoenix	**82**	—	**36.1**	.494	—	.830	**3.2**	5.4	**2.6**	**.5**	20.5
1976–77	Phoenix	81	—	32.1	.518	—	.825	2.3	5.7	1.7	.3	21.3
1977–78	Phoenix	80	—	31.0	.516	—	.813	2.1	5.5	1.7	.4	**25.2**
1978–79	Phoenix	81	—	32.6	**.535**	—	.837	2.0	**6.5**	1.4	.3	24.0
1979–80	Phoenix	**82**	**82**	32.5	.525	.280	**.862**	2.3	5.1	1.5	.4	21.9
1980–81	Seattle	36	—	29.9	.442	.240	.832	1.9	4.1	1.3	.4	16.7
1981–82	New York	18	12	25.1	.443	.250	.766	1.2	5.6	1.1	.4	11.7
1982–83	New York	80	59	24.7	.459	**.292**	.804	1.4	5.5	1.1	.2	10.0
1983–84	Phoenix	59	2	14.7	.460	.269	.824	.7	2.5	.7	.1	7.0
Career		823	155	25.5	.504	.275	.820	1.9	4.4	1.3	.3	15.6
All-Star		5	4	25.6	.632	.000	.688	1.4	4.8	1.2	1.0	19.4

=== Playoffs ===
Year	Team	GP	MPG	FG%	3P%	FT%	RPG	APG	STL	BLK	PPG
1973	Boston	11	9.9	.487	—	.714	.6	.8	—	—	3.9
1974†	Boston	18	13.4	.460	—	.714	1.2	1.7	.4	.1	5.7
1975	Boston	11	16.6	.469	—	.667	1.2	2.9	.5	.2	8.0
1976	Phoenix	**19**	**36.1**	**.511**	—	.763	2.5	5.1	**1.8**	**.5**	21.1
1978	Phoenix	2	33.0	.468	—	**.889**	**3.0**	**9.5**	.5	.0	**26.0**
1979	Phoenix	15	35.6	.495	—	.788	2.2	4.3	1.0	.3	22.4
1980	Phoenix	8	31.6	.486	.083	.875	1.3	3.9	1.4	.4	20.9
1983	New York	6	26.0	.440	**.375**	.769	1.3	5.7	.3	.3	9.5
1984	Phoenix	17	13.1	.375	.222	.875	.5	2.2	.7	.0	5.3
Career		107	22.9	.481	.207	.789	1.4	3.3	.9	.2	12.5

== Personal life and death ==
Westphal was married to Cindy Westphal for over 40 years and they had two children together. He was a Christian.

In August 2020, ESPN reported that Westphal had been diagnosed with brain cancer. He died in Scottsdale, Arizona, on January 2, 2021, at the age of 70.

== Head coaching record ==
=== NBA ===
Legend
Regular season	G	Games coached	W	Games won	L	Games lost	W–L %	Win–loss %
Playoffs	PG	Playoff games	PW	Playoff wins	PL	Playoff losses	PW–L %	Playoff win–loss %

Team	Year	G	W	L	W–L%	Finish	PG	PW	PL	PW–L%	Result
Phoenix	1992–93	82	62	20	.756	1st in Pacific	24	13	11	.542	Lost in NBA Finals
Phoenix	1993–94	82	56	26	.683	2nd in Pacific	10	6	4	.600	Lost in Conference semifinals
Phoenix	1994–95	82	59	23	.720	1st in Pacific	10	6	4	.600	Lost in Conference semifinals
Phoenix	1995–96	33	14	19	.424	(fired)	—	—	—	—	—
Seattle	1998–99	50	25	25	.500	5th in Pacific	—	—	—	—	Missed playoffs
Seattle	1999–2000	82	45	37	.549	4th in Pacific	5	2	3	.400	Lost in first round
Seattle	2000–01	15	6	9	.400	(fired)	—	—	—	—	—
Sacramento	2009–10	82	25	57	.305	5th in Pacific	—	—	—	—	Missed playoffs
Sacramento	2010–11	82	24	58	.293	5th in Pacific	—	—	—	—	Missed playoffs
Sacramento	2011–12	7	2	5	.286	(fired)	—	—	—	—	—
Career		597	318	279	.533		49	27	22	.551	

=== College ===
Record table
Season	Team	Overall	Conference	Standing	Postseason
Southwestern Baptist Bible Eagles (National Little College Athletic Association) (1985–1986)
1985–86	Southwestern Baptist Bible	21–9			NLCAA Tournament
Southwestern Baptist Bible:		21–9 (.700)			
Grand Canyon Antelopes (NAIA independent) (1986–1988)
1986–87	Grand Canyon	26–12			
1987–88	Grand Canyon	37–6			NAIA Champions
Grand Canyon:		63–18 (.778)			
Pepperdine Waves (West Coast Conference) (2001–2006)
2001–02	Pepperdine	21–9	13–1	T–1st	NCAA Division I First Round
2002–03	Pepperdine	15–13	7–7	4th	
2003–04	Pepperdine	15–15	9–5	T–2nd	
2004–05	Pepperdine	17–14	6–8	T–5th	
2005–06	Pepperdine	7–20	3–11	8th	
Pepperdine:		75–71 (.514)	38–32 (.543)		
Total:		159–98 (.619)			
National champion Postseason invitational champion Conference regular season champion Conference regular season and conference tournament champion Division regular season champion Division regular season and conference tournament champion Conference tournament champion
