= Dan Dickau =

American basketball player (born 1978)

Personal information
- Born: September 16, 1978 (age 48) Portland, Oregon, U.S.
- Listed height: 6 ft 0 in (1.83 m)
- Listed weight: 180 lb (82 kg)

Career information
- High school: Prairie (Brush Prairie, Washington)
- College: Washington (1997–1999); Gonzaga (2000–2002)
- NBA draft: 2002: 1st round, 28th overall pick
- Drafted by: Sacramento Kings
- Playing career: 2002–2010
- Position: Point guard
- Number: 12, 7, 21, 2, 20, 10

Career history
- 2002–2004: Atlanta Hawks
- 2004: Portland Trail Blazers
- 2004: Dallas Mavericks
- 2004–2005: New Orleans Hornets
- 2005–2006: Boston Celtics
- 2006–2007: Portland Trail Blazers
- 2007–2008: Los Angeles Clippers
- 2009: Brose Baskets
- 2010: Fort Wayne Mad Ants

Career highlights
- Consensus first-team All-American (2002); WCC Player of the Year (2002); 2× First-team All-WCC (2001, 2002); 2x WCC Tournament MVP (2001, 2002); No. 21 retired by Gonzaga Bulldogs
- Stats at NBA.com
- Stats at Basketball Reference
Medals
Men's basketball
Representing United States
Summer Universiade
Bronze medal – third place	2001 Beijing	Team competition

Daniel David Dickau (born September 16, 1978) is an American former professional basketball player who currently works as an on-air broadcaster for ESPN, the Pac-12 Network, CBS Sports Network, Fox Sports and Westwood One. He is also a co-host of the Dickau and Slim Show on Spokane's 700 ESPN with Sean "Slim" Widmer.

== Early life and college ==
Born in Portland, Oregon, Dickau graduated from Prairie High School in nearby Brush Prairie, Washington. He enrolled at the University of Washington in Seattle in 1997 and played for the Huskies under head coach Bob Bender. Dickau fractured his heel 13 games into the 1998–99 season and announced his decision to transfer in April.

He enrolled at Gonzaga University in Spokane and sat out the 1999–2000 season as a transfer, a de facto redshirt year. He was a standout point guard for the Bulldogs for two seasons under head coach Mark Few, named a first team All-American his senior year in 2002.

== NBA career ==
=== Player ===
Dickau played six years in the NBA. His relatively short NBA stint was due to a combination of severe injuries and his "pass-first" playing style. He was selected in the first round of the 2002 NBA draft by the Sacramento Kings, the 28th overall pick. He was traded eight times during his six-year NBA career:

- to the Atlanta Hawks (#12) on June 26, 2002 (on draft night for a first-round pick);
- to the Portland Trail Blazers (#7) on February 9, 2004 (Rasheed Wallace trade);
- to the Golden State Warriors (#10) on July 20, 2004 (Nick Van Exel trade);
- to the Dallas Mavericks (#21) on August 24, 2004 (Erick Dampier trade);
- to the New Orleans Hornets (#2) on December 3, 2004 (Darrell Armstrong trade);
- to the Boston Celtics (#20) on October 1, 2005 (New Orleans received a second-round draft pick);
- to the Portland Trail Blazers (for a second time, via a trade involving former teammate Theo Ratliff) (#2) on June 28, 2006, and
- to the New York Knicks (#1) on June 28, 2007 (Zach Randolph and Steve Francis trade).

For two years in a row, Dickau was traded in a draft-day trade package, first from the Celtics to the Trail Blazers, then from the Trail Blazers to the Knicks.

Dickau's best season came in 2004–05 with the New Orleans Hornets, where he saw significant playing time and led the team in total assists, total steals, and 3-pointers made. During the season, he scored 20 or more points in seven games and had five double-doubles.

On December 17, 2005, as a member of the Celtics, his season was ended by a ruptured Achilles tendon sustained while playing against the Chicago Bulls. At the time, he was averaging 3.3 points per game and 2.1 assists per game. On June 28, 2006, the Celtics traded Dickau, center Raef LaFrentz and the 7th pick in the 2006 NBA draft to the Trail Blazers for center Theo Ratliff and guard Sebastian Telfair. Dickau was then sent to the Knicks along with Randolph, only to be waived when the Knicks acquired Jared Jordan. Two days later, Dickau signed with the Clippers.

On October 1, 2008, Dickau signed with the Golden State Warriors. Terms of the agreement were not disclosed per team policy. He played in two preseason games. Against the Portland Trail Blazers on October 8, Dickau played 21 minutes and scored 8 points and grabbed 5 rebounds. On October 19, 2008, Dickau was waived by the Warriors. On September 23, 2009, Dickau accepted an invitation to the Phoenix Suns training camp. He was waived by the Suns on October 21. With the Suns, Dickau played in five preseason games.

Dickau's final regular season NBA game was played on April 16, 2008, in a 75–93 loss to the Houston Rockets where he recorded 2 points, 1 assist and 1 rebound.

Dickau signed with the Fort Wayne Mad Ants on February 16, 2010.

=== Coach ===
Before the beginning of the 2011–12 season, Dickau was hired by the Trail Blazers as a player development assistant.

== International career ==
On August 12, 2008, Dickau signed with Air Avellino of the Italian League. Dickau and the team agreed to terminate his contract on September 29, 2008. He joined the Brose Baskets of the German Basketball Bundesliga in January 2009.

== Career statistics ==
Legend
GP	Games played	GS	Games started	MPG	Minutes per game
FG%	Field goal percentage	3P%	3-point field goal percentage	FT%	Free throw percentage
RPG	Rebounds per game	APG	Assists per game	SPG	Steals per game
BPG	Blocks per game	PPG	Points per game	**Bold**	Career high

=== College ===
Year	Team	GP	GS	MPG	FG%	3P%	FT%	RPG	APG	SPG	BPG	PPG
1997–98	Washington	28	0	9.4	.420	**.533**	.795	.9	1.0	.3	–	3.8
1998–99	Washington	13	11	22.8	.393	.355	.714	2.9	2.6	**.8**	–	4.6
1999–2000	Gonzaga	Transfer										
2000–01	Gonzaga	24	24	33.7	**.485**	.480	**.866**	**3.3**	**6.3**	**.8**	**.1**	18.9
2001–02	Gonzaga	**32**	**32**	**34.7**	.441	.457	.864	3.0	4.7	**.8**	**.1**	**21.0**
Career		97	67	25.5	.451	.462	.854	2.4	3.7	.7	.1	13.3

=== NBA ===
==== Regular season ====
Year	Team	GP	GS	MPG	FG%	3P%	FT%	RPG	APG	SPG	BPG	PPG
2002–03	Atlanta	50	0	10.3	.412	.361	.808	.9	1.7	.3	.0	3.7
2003–04	Atlanta	23	0	6.2	**.429**	.300	.667	.7	.8	.4	.0	2.1
2003–04	Portland	20	0	7.6	.327	.350	.875	.5	1.0	.4	.0	2.3
2004–05	Dallas	4	0	4.0	.125	.333	.667	.3	.3	.0	.0	1.3
2004–05	New Orleans	67	**46**	**31.0**	.408	.347	.836	**2.7**	**5.2**	**1.1**	**.1**	**13.2**
2005–06	Boston	19	0	12.3	.370	**.500**	**1.000**	.8	2.1	.6	**.1**	3.3
2006–07	Portland	50	3	8.9	.358	.262	.792	.9	1.4	.3	.0	3.3
2007–08	L.A. Clippers	67	8	15.5	.419	.333	.829	1.4	2.6	.5	.0	5.3
Career		300	57	15.4	.401	.341	.831	1.4	2.5	.5	.0	5.8

== Personal life ==
Dickau is a Christian. Dickau and his wife Heather married in the fall of 2002 and have 7 children (2 boys and 5 girls). He also has 3 nieces and 2 nephews
