= All-NBA Team =

National Basketball Association honor

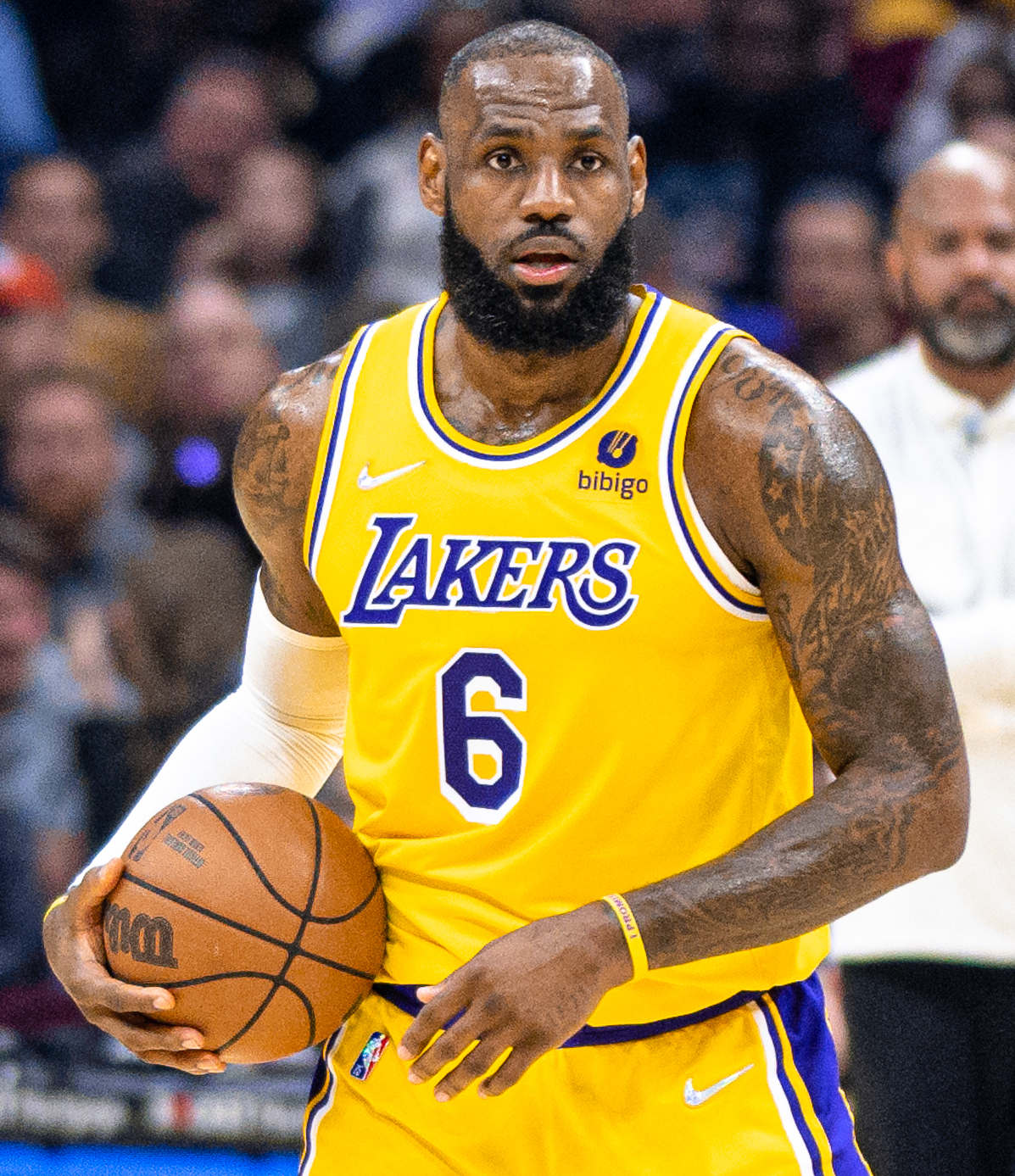
LeBron James has been selected to the All-NBA team a record 21 times, including a record 13 times as a member of the All-NBA first team.

The All-NBA Team is an annual National Basketball Association (NBA) honor bestowed on the best players in the league following every NBA season. The voting is conducted by a global panel of sportswriters and broadcasters. (Note: The voting panel was from the United States and Canada before expanding in 2017.) The team has been selected in every season of the league's existence, dating back to its inaugural season in 1946. The All-NBA Team originally had two teams, but since 1988 it is composed of three five-man lineups—a first, second, and third team.

From 1956 through 2023, voters selected two guards, two forwards, and one center for each team. This contrasts with the voting for starters of the NBA All-Star Game, which has chosen two backcourt and three frontcourt players since 2013. The NBA's sister league, the Women's National Basketball Association (WNBA), announced late in its 2022 season that it was changing the composition of its All-WNBA Teams from the All-NBA format to a "positionless" format in which members are selected without regard to position. Starting with the 2023–24 season, coinciding with the start of a new collective bargaining agreement (CBA) between the NBA and its players' union, the NBA adopted the WNBA's "positionless" format for All-NBA team composition—which the NBA had originally used before adopting a positional model in 1955–56. NBA players receive five points for a first team vote, three points for a second team vote, and one point for a third team vote. Starting in 2023–24, the five highest point totals regardless of position make up the first team, with the second and third teams following. During the positional era, the players with the highest point totals at each position made the first team, with the next highest making the second team and so forth. On one occasion, six players were placed on a team, when Bob Davies and Dolph Schayes tied for the first team in 1952; the second team remained at five.

As part of effort to reduce load management for top stars in the league, the 2023–24 season introduced an eligibility threshold of 65 games played (out of the normal 82-game schedule) for most major regular-season playing awards and honors, including the All-NBA Team. To receive credit for a game for purposes of award eligibility, a player must have been credited with at least 20 minutes played. However, two "near misses", in which the player appeared for 15 to 19 minutes, can be included in the 65-game count. Protections also exist for players who suffer season-ending injuries, who are eligible with 62 credited games, and those affected by what the CBA calls "bad faith circumstances".

During the era of position-based team composition, voters were instructed to "vote for the player at the position he plays regularly", and some used the flexibility to designate a player at a position which was not their primary role. A player who received votes at multiple positions was classified at the position in which they received the most votes. This occasionally caused a player to be slotted to a lower team or miss an All-NBA selection altogether. For example, Draymond Green received votes at forward and center in 2016, but he was placed on the second team as a forward although he had more total points than the first-team center, DeAndre Jordan. In 2020, Khris Middleton garnered votes at both forward and guard, yet he was not on the third team despite having more points overall than Ben Simmons and Russell Westbrook, who were selected at guard.

LeBron James has the most All-NBA selections with twenty-one. Kareem Abdul-Jabbar, Kobe Bryant, and Tim Duncan previously shared the record with fifteen. James also has the most All-NBA First Team honors with thirteen and is the only player to have done so as a member of three different teams, while Bryant and Karl Malone are tied for second-most with eleven. Malone and James each share a record eleven consecutive first-team selections. James is both the youngest and oldest player to earn All-NBA honors, with his first All-NBA selection coming at the age of 20, and his most recent coming at the age of 40. Hakeem Olajuwon became the first international player to be named All-NBA in 1985–86. Since 2019, at least two international players have been named each season to the All-NBA First Team, including four players for the first time in 2023.

== Selections ==
^	Denotes players who are still active in the NBA
*	Denotes players inducted to the Naismith Memorial Basketball Hall of Fame
†	Not yet eligible for Hall of Fame consideration (Note: A player is not eligible for induction into the Naismith Memorial Basketball Hall of Fame until he has been fully retired for two calendar years.)
§	1st time eligible for Hall of Fame in 2027
Player (#)	Denotes the number of times the player has been selected
**Player** **(in bold text)**	Indicates the player who won the NBA Most Valuable Player in the same year (Note: The Most Valuable Player award was first established in 1956.)

=== 1946–47 to 1954–55 ===
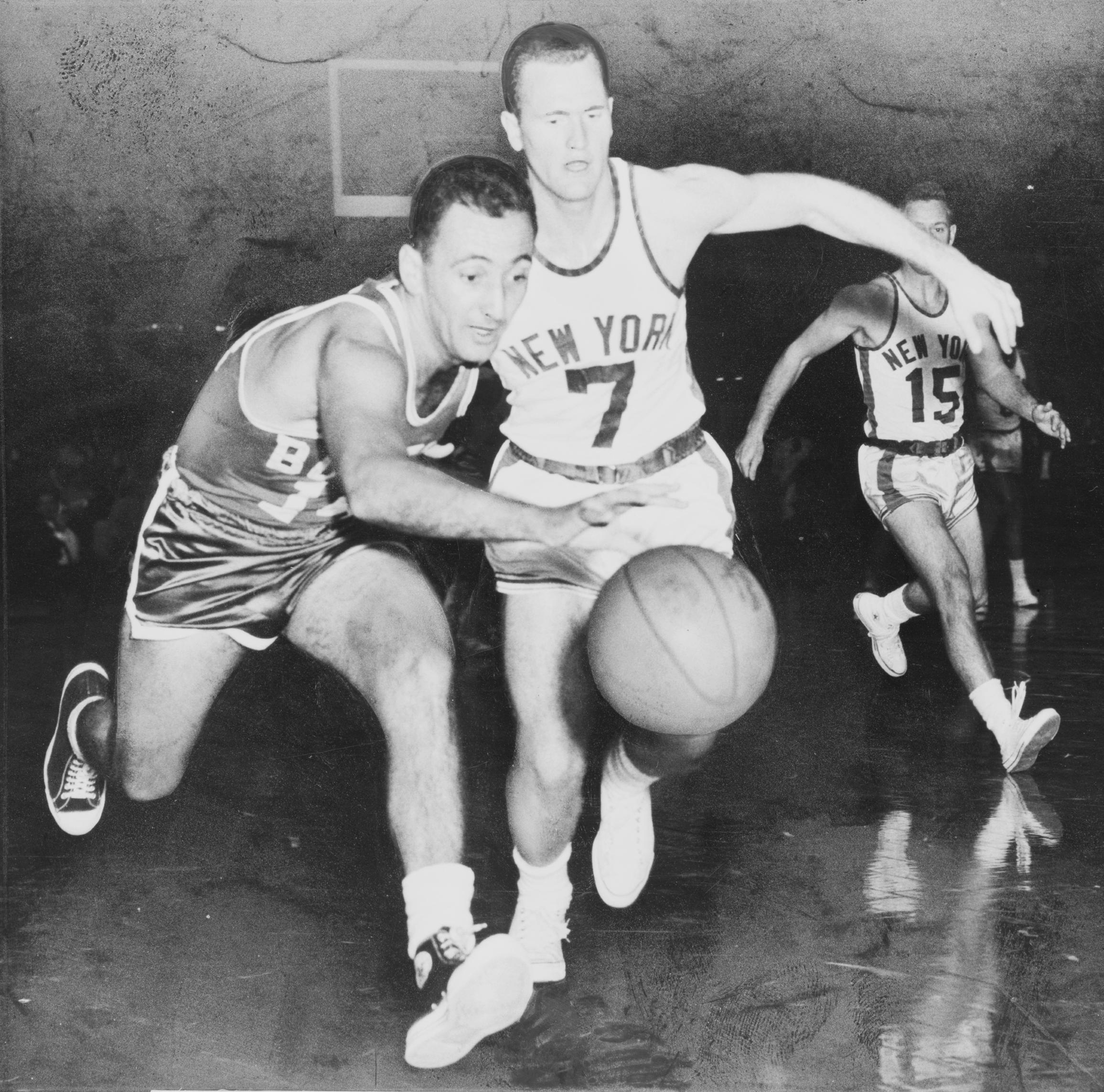
Bob Cousy was selected to the All-NBA team 12 times.

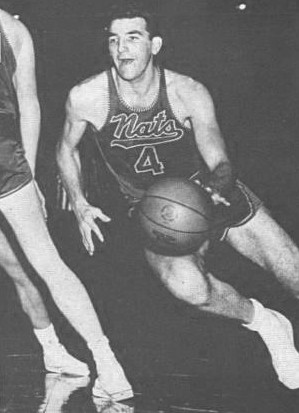
Dolph Schayes made an All-NBA Team every season of the 1950s.

From the 1946–47 season to 1954–55 season, the All-NBA Team was composed of two teams, each with five roster spots, except when there were ties. During this period, players were selected without regard to position.

Season	First team		Second team	
Season	Players	Teams	Players	Teams
1946–47	(United States) Joe Fulks*	Philadelphia Warriors	(United States) Ernie Calverley	Providence Steamrollers
1946–47	(United States) Bob Feerick	Washington Capitols	(United States) Frank Baumholtz	Cleveland Rebels
1946–47	(United States) Stan Miasek	Detroit Falcons	(United States) Johnny Logan	St. Louis Bombers
1946–47	(United States) Bones McKinney	Washington Capitols	(United States) Chick Halbert	Chicago Stags
1946–47	(United States) Max Zaslofsky	Chicago Stags	(United States) Fred Scolari	Washington Capitols
1947–48	(United States) Joe Fulks* (2)	Philadelphia Warriors	(United States) Johnny Logan (2)	St. Louis Bombers
1947–48	(United States) Max Zaslofsky (2)	Chicago Stags	(United States) Carl Braun*	New York Knicks
1947–48	(United States) Ed Sadowski	Boston Celtics	(United States) Stan Miasek (2)	Chicago Stags
1947–48	(United States) Howie Dallmar	Philadelphia Warriors	(United States) Fred Scolari (2)	Washington Capitols
1947–48	(United States) Bob Feerick (2)	Washington Capitols	(United States) Buddy Jeannette*	Baltimore Bullets
1948–49	(United States) George Mikan*	Minneapolis Lakers	(United States) Arnie Risen*	Rochester Royals
1948–49	(United States) Joe Fulks* (3)	Philadelphia Warriors	(United States) Bob Feerick (3)	Washington Capitols
1948–49	(United States) Bob Davies*	Rochester Royals	(United States) Bones McKinney (2)	Washington Capitols
1948–49	(United States) Max Zaslofsky (3)	Chicago Stags	(United States) Ken Sailors	Providence Steamrollers
1948–49	(United States) Jim Pollard*	Minneapolis Lakers	(United States) Johnny Logan (3)	St. Louis Bombers
1949–50	(United States) George Mikan* (2)	Minneapolis Lakers	(United States) Frank Brian	Anderson Packers
1949–50	(United States) Jim Pollard* (2)	Minneapolis Lakers	(United States) Fred Schaus	Fort Wayne Pistons
1949–50	(United States) Alex Groza	Indianapolis Olympians	(United States) Dolph Schayes*	Syracuse Nationals
1949–50	(United States) Bob Davies* (2)	Rochester Royals	(United States) Al Cervi*	Syracuse Nationals
1949–50	(United States) Max Zaslofsky (4)	Chicago Stags	(United States) Ralph Beard	Indianapolis Olympians
1950–51	(United States) George Mikan* (3)	Minneapolis Lakers	(United States) Dolph Schayes* (2)	Syracuse Nationals
1950–51	(United States) Alex Groza (2)	Indianapolis Olympians	(United States) Frank Brian (2)	Tri-Cities Blackhawks
1950–51	(United States) Ed Macauley*	Boston Celtics	(United States) Vern Mikkelsen*	Minneapolis Lakers
1950–51	(United States) Bob Davies* (3)	Rochester Royals	(United States) Joe Fulks* (4)	Philadelphia Warriors
1950–51	(United States) Ralph Beard (2)	Indianapolis Olympians	(United States) Dick McGuire*	New York Knicks
1951–52	(United States) George Mikan* (4)	Minneapolis Lakers	(United States) Larry Foust	Fort Wayne Pistons
1951–52	(United States) Ed Macauley* (2)	Boston Celtics	(United States) Vern Mikkelsen* (2)	Minneapolis Lakers
1951–52	(United States) Paul Arizin*	Philadelphia Warriors	(United States) Jim Pollard* (3)	Minneapolis Lakers
1951–52	(United States) Bob Cousy*	Boston Celtics	(United States) Bobby Wanzer*	Rochester Royals
1951–52	(United States) Bob Davies* (4) (tie)	Rochester Royals	(United States) Andy Phillip*	Philadelphia Warriors
1951–52	(United States) Dolph Schayes* (3) (tie)	Syracuse Nationals	(United States) Andy Phillip*	Philadelphia Warriors
1952–53	(United States) George Mikan* (5)	Minneapolis Lakers	(United States) Bill Sharman*	Boston Celtics
1952–53	(United States) Bob Cousy* (2)	Boston Celtics	(United States) Vern Mikkelsen* (3)	Minneapolis Lakers
1952–53	(United States) Neil Johnston*	Philadelphia Warriors	(United States) Bobby Wanzer* (2)	Rochester Royals
1952–53	(United States) Ed Macauley* (3)	Boston Celtics	(United States) Bob Davies* (5)	Rochester Royals
1952–53	(United States) Dolph Schayes* (4)	Syracuse Nationals	(United States) Andy Phillip* (2)	Philadelphia Warriors
1953–54	(United States) Bob Cousy* (3)	Boston Celtics	(United States) Ed Macauley* (4)	Boston Celtics
1953–54	(United States) Neil Johnston* (2)	Philadelphia Warriors	(United States) Jim Pollard* (4)	Minneapolis Lakers
1953–54	(United States) George Mikan* (6)	Minneapolis Lakers	(United States) Carl Braun* (2)	New York Knicks
1953–54	(United States) Dolph Schayes* (5)	Syracuse Nationals	(United States) Bobby Wanzer* (3)	Rochester Royals
1953–54	(United States) Harry Gallatin*	New York Knicks	(United States) Paul Seymour	Syracuse Nationals
1954–55	(United States) Neil Johnston* (3)	Philadelphia Warriors	(United States) Vern Mikkelsen* (4)	Minneapolis Lakers
1954–55	(United States) Bob Cousy* (4)	Boston Celtics	(United States) Harry Gallatin* (2)	New York Knicks
1954–55	(United States) Dolph Schayes* (6)	Syracuse Nationals	(United States) Paul Seymour (2)	Syracuse Nationals
1954–55	(United States) Bob Pettit*	Milwaukee Hawks	(United States) Slater Martin*	Minneapolis Lakers
1954–55	(United States) Larry Foust (2)	Fort Wayne Pistons	(United States) Bill Sharman* (2)	Boston Celtics

=== 1955–56 to 1987–88 ===
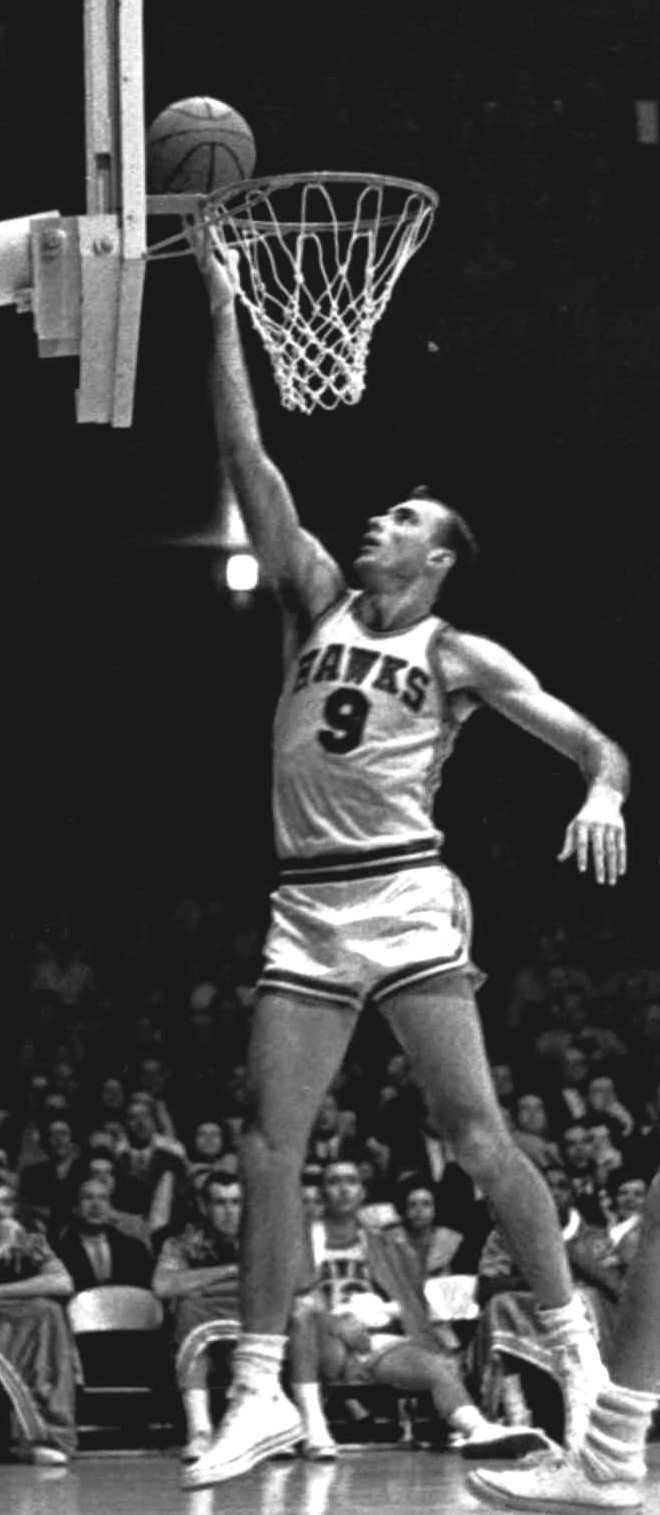
Bob Pettit made 10 straight All-NBA First Teams from 1955 to 1964.

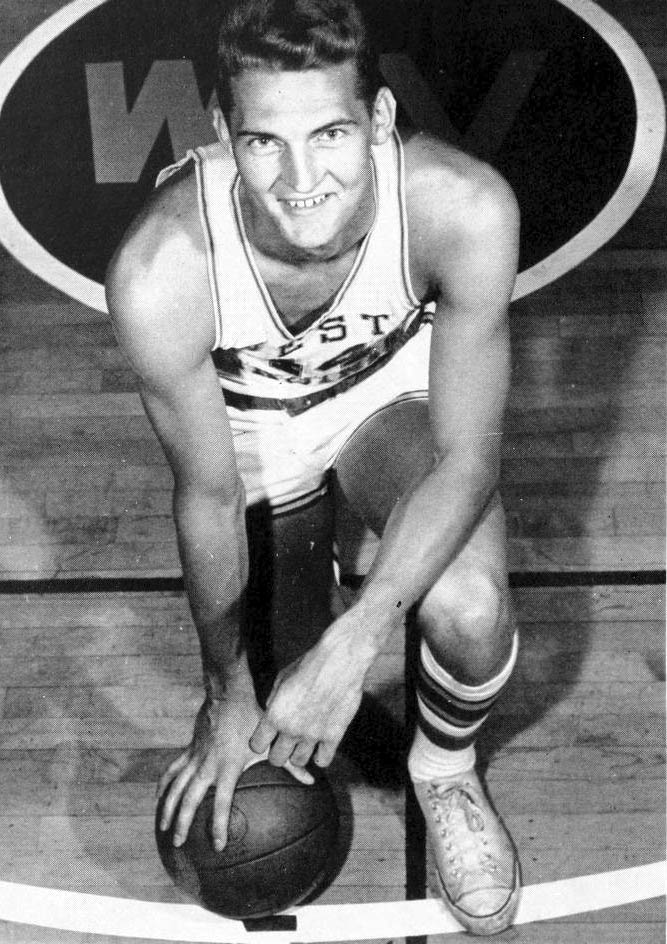
Jerry West made 12 All-NBA Teams - the seventh-most in NBA history.

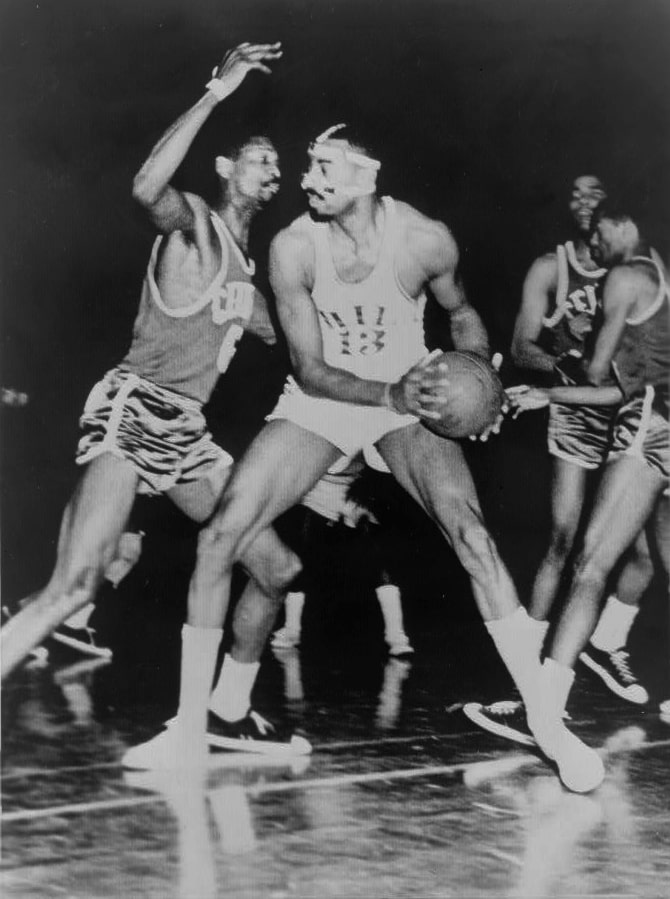
Bill Russell (left) has been selected to the All-NBA team 11 times. Wilt Chamberlain (center) has been selected to the All-NBA team 10 times.

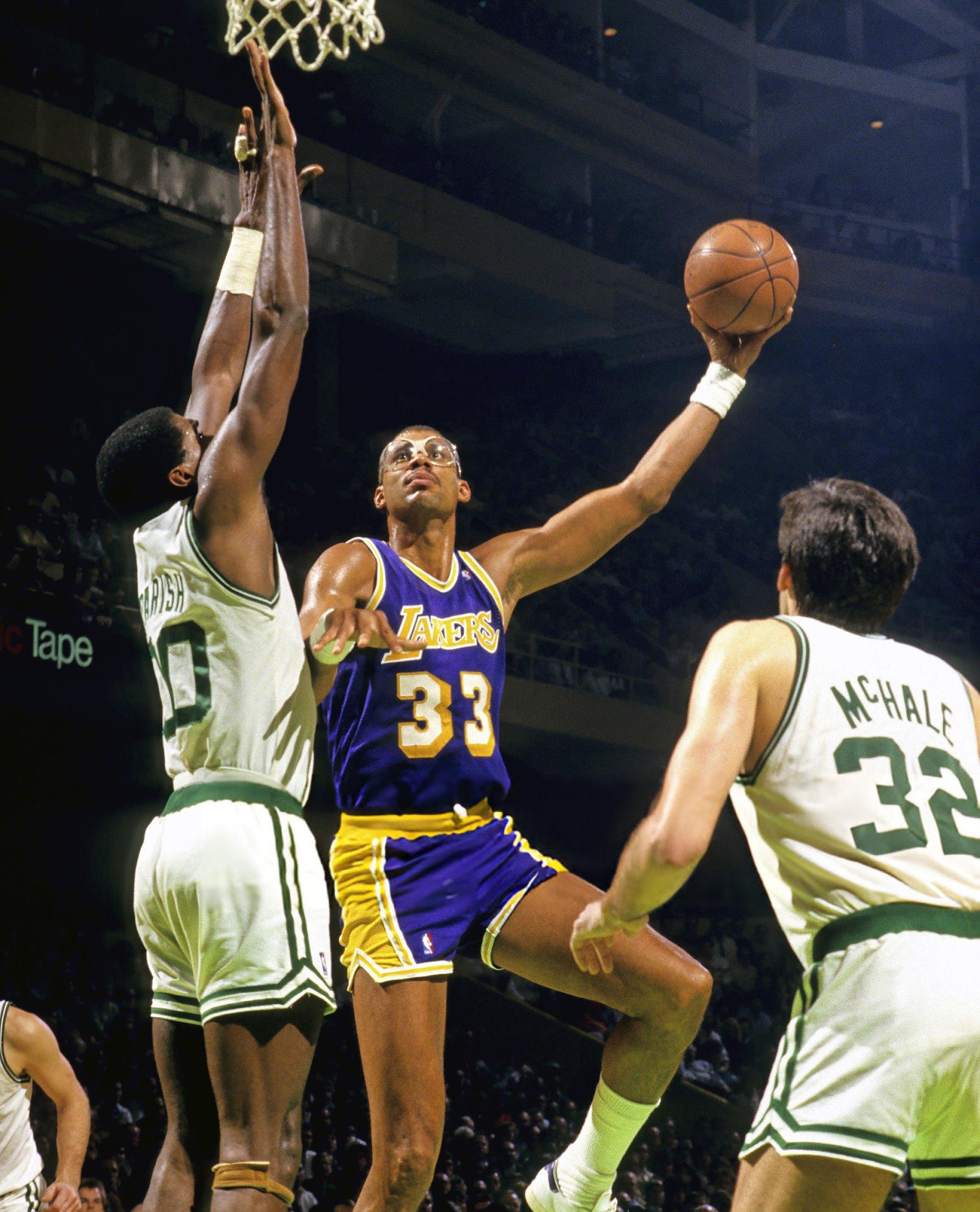
Kareem Abdul-Jabbar has been selected to the All-NBA team 15 times.

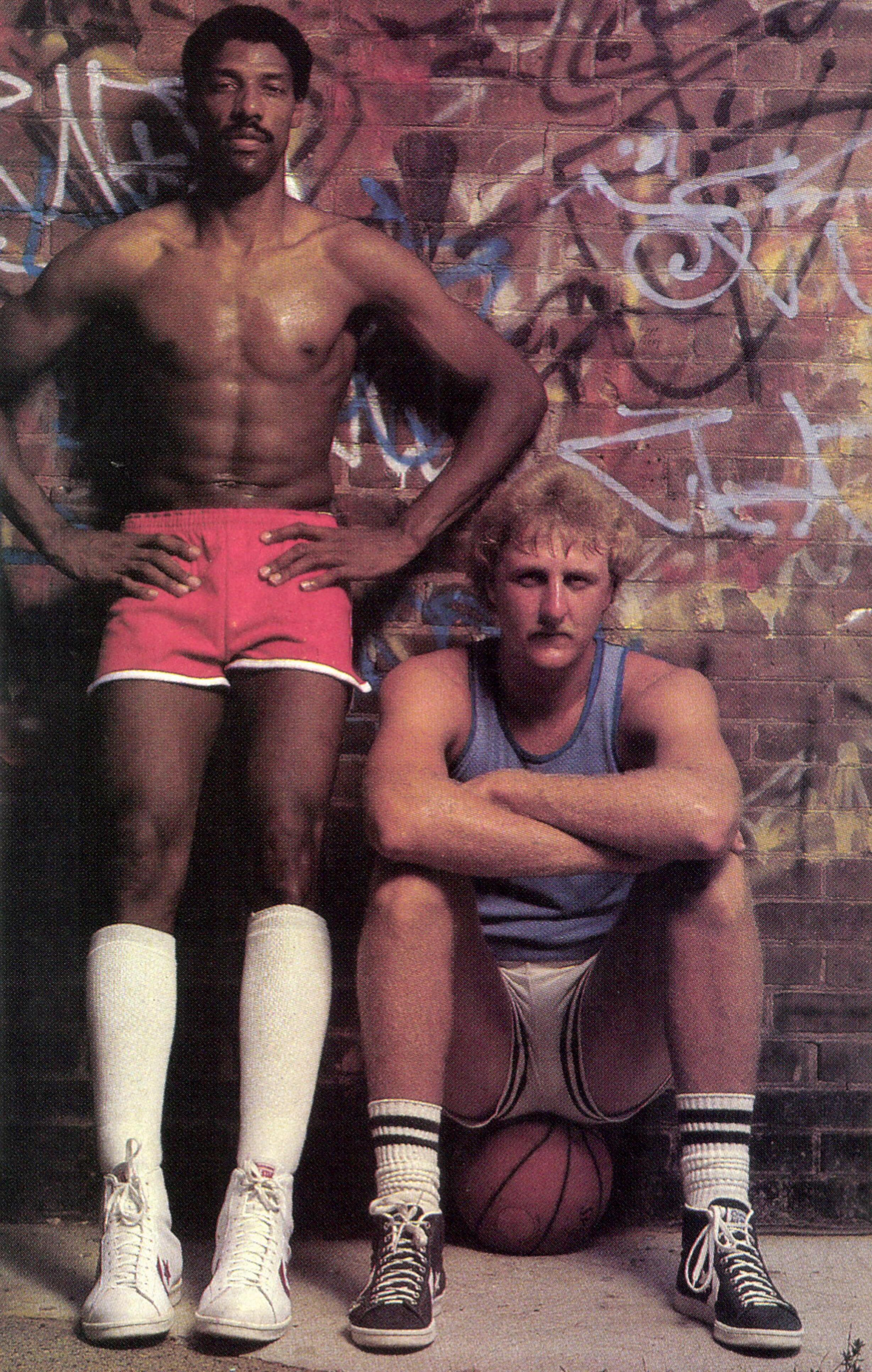
Julius Erving (left) made 7 All-NBA teams, and Larry Bird (right) made 10 All-NBA teams.

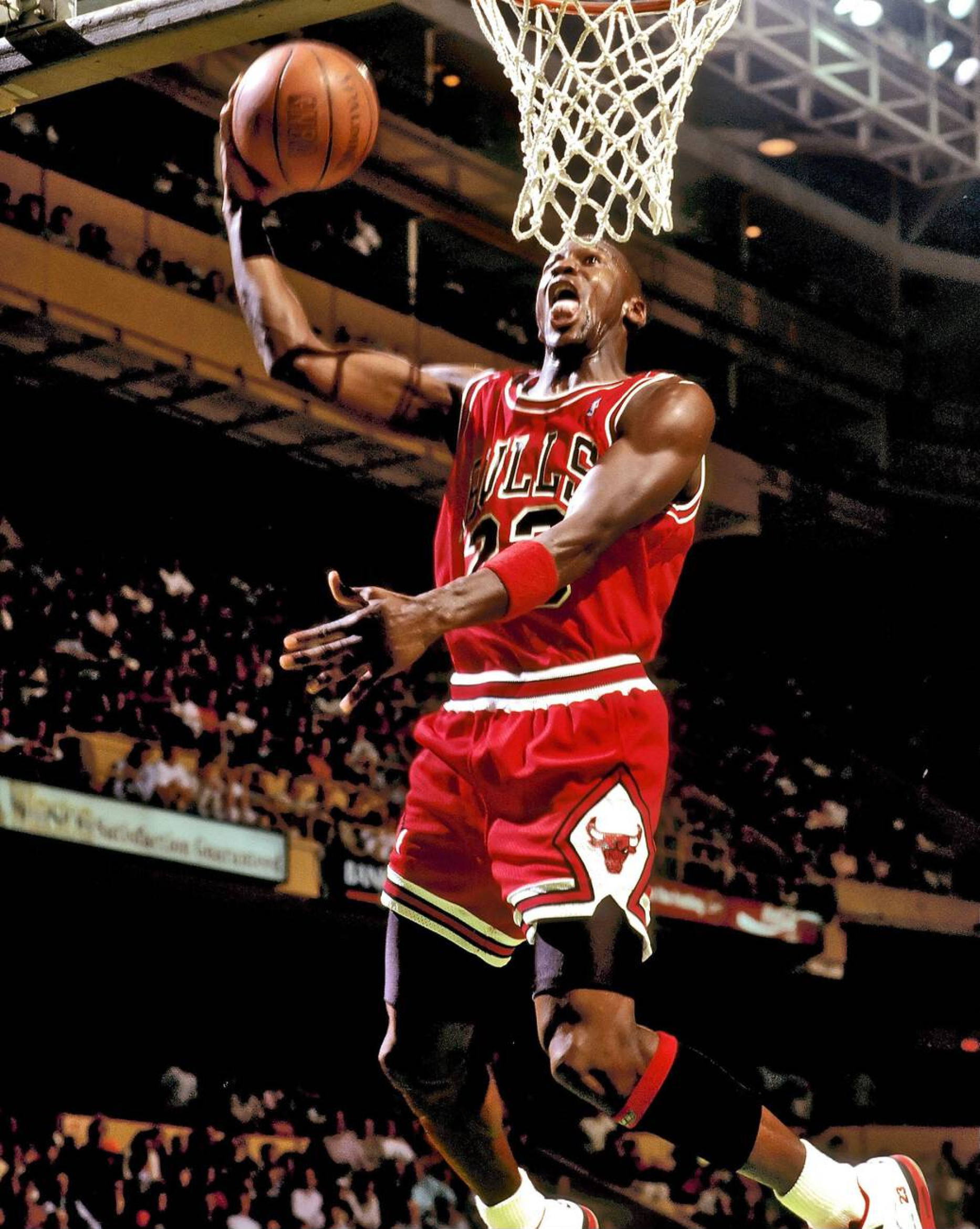
Michael Jordan has been selected to the All-NBA team 11 times.

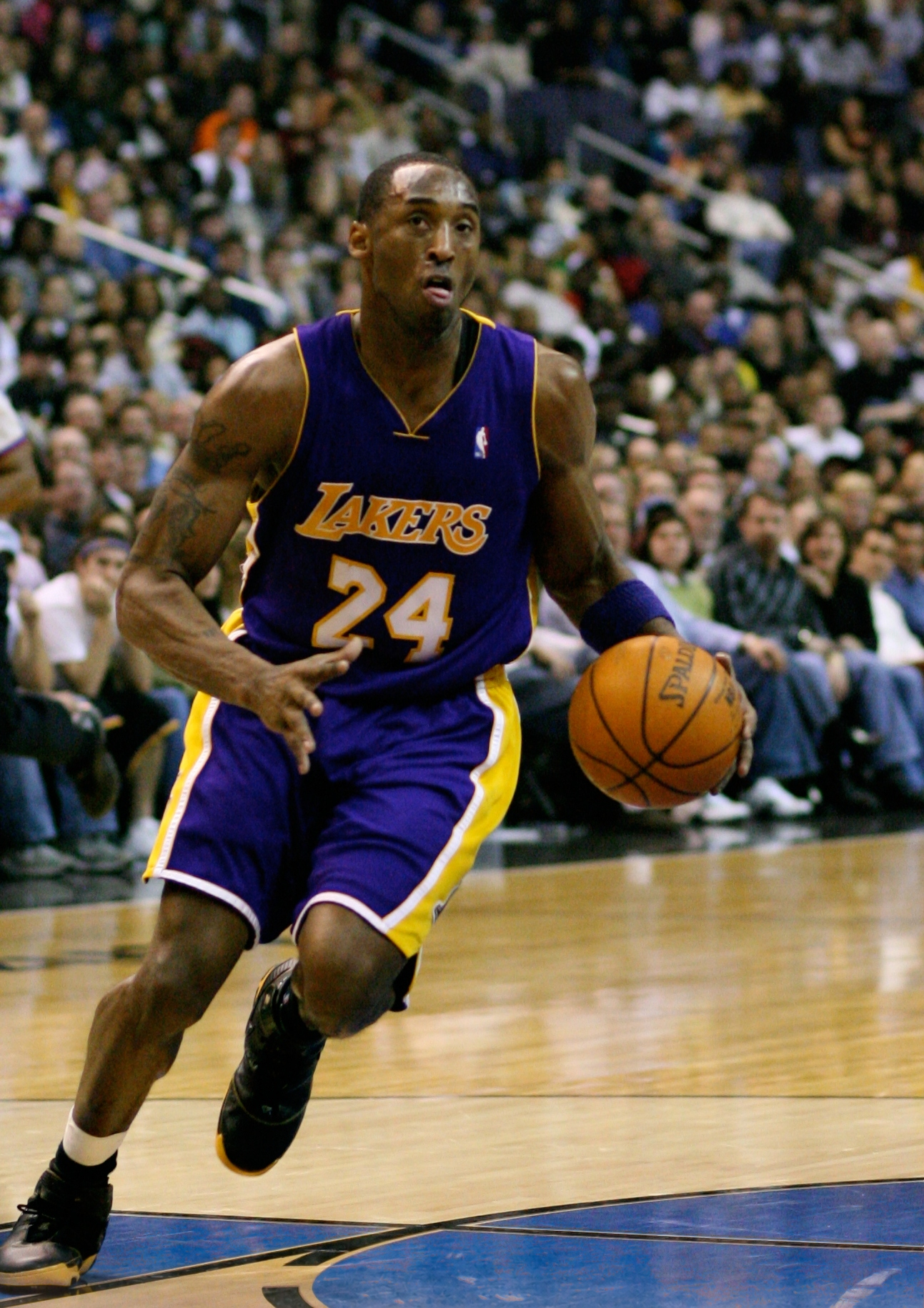
Kobe Bryant has been selected to the All-NBA team 15 times.

From the 1955–56 season to 1987–88 season, the All-NBA Team was composed of two teams, each with five roster spots, except when there were ties. During this time, players were selected with regard to position.

Season	Positions	First team		Second team	
Season	Positions	Players	Teams	Players	Teams
1955–56	Forward	(United States) **Bob Pettit*** (2)	St. Louis Hawks	(United States) Dolph Schayes* (7)	Syracuse Nationals
1955–56	Forward	(United States) Paul Arizin* (2)	Philadelphia Warriors	(United States) Maurice Stokes*	Rochester Royals
1955–56	Center	(United States) Neil Johnston* (4)	Philadelphia Warriors	(United States) Clyde Lovellette*	Minneapolis Lakers
1955–56	Guard	(United States) Bob Cousy* (5)	Boston Celtics	(United States) Slater Martin* (2)	Minneapolis Lakers
1955–56	Guard	(United States) Bill Sharman* (3)	Boston Celtics	(United States) Jack George	Philadelphia Warriors
1956–57	Forward	(United States) Paul Arizin* (3)	Philadelphia Warriors	(United States) George Yardley*	Fort Wayne Pistons
1956–57	Forward	(United States) Dolph Schayes* (8)	Syracuse Nationals	(United States) Maurice Stokes* (2)	Rochester Royals
1956–57	Center	(United States) Bob Pettit* (3)	St. Louis Hawks	(United States) Neil Johnston* (5)	Philadelphia Warriors
1956–57	Guard	(United States) **Bob Cousy*** (6)	Boston Celtics	(United States) Dick Garmaker	Minneapolis Lakers
1956–57	Guard	(United States) Bill Sharman* (4)	Boston Celtics	(United States) Slater Martin* (3)	St. Louis Hawks
1957–58	Forward	(United States) Dolph Schayes* (9)	Syracuse Nationals	(United States) Cliff Hagan*	St. Louis Hawks
1957–58	Forward	(United States) George Yardley* (2)	Detroit Pistons	(United States) Maurice Stokes* (3)	Cincinnati Royals
1957–58	Center	(United States) Bob Pettit* (4)	St. Louis Hawks	(United States) **Bill Russell***	Boston Celtics
1957–58	Guard	(United States) Bob Cousy* (7)	Boston Celtics	(United States) Tom Gola*	Philadelphia Warriors
1957–58	Guard	(United States) Bill Sharman* (5)	Boston Celtics	(United States) Slater Martin* (4)	St. Louis Hawks
1958–59	Forward	(United States) **Bob Pettit*** (5)	St. Louis Hawks	(United States) Paul Arizin (4)	Philadelphia Warriors
1958–59	Forward	(United States) Elgin Baylor*	Minneapolis Lakers	(United States) Cliff Hagan* (2)	St. Louis Hawks
1958–59	Center	(United States) Bill Russell* (2)	Boston Celtics	(United States) Dolph Schayes* (10)	Syracuse Nationals
1958–59	Guard	(United States) Bob Cousy* (8)	Boston Celtics	(United States) Slater Martin* (5)	St. Louis Hawks
1958–59	Guard	(United States) Bill Sharman* (6)	Boston Celtics	(United States) Richie Guerin*	New York Knicks
1959–60	Forward	(United States) Bob Pettit* (6)	St. Louis Hawks	(United States) Jack Twyman*	Cincinnati Royals
1959–60	Forward	(United States) Elgin Baylor* (2)	Minneapolis Lakers	(United States) Dolph Schayes* (11)	Syracuse Nationals
1959–60	Center	(United States) **Wilt Chamberlain***	Philadelphia Warriors	(United States) Bill Russell* (3)	Boston Celtics
1959–60	Guard	(United States) Bob Cousy* (9)	Boston Celtics	(United States) Richie Guerin* (2)	New York Knicks
1959–60	Guard	(United States) Gene Shue	Detroit Pistons	(United States) Bill Sharman* (7)	Boston Celtics
1960–61	Forward	(United States) Elgin Baylor* (3)	Los Angeles Lakers	(United States) Dolph Schayes* (12)	Syracuse Nationals
1960–61	Forward	(United States) Bob Pettit* (7)	St. Louis Hawks	(United States) Tom Heinsohn*	Boston Celtics
1960–61	Center	(United States) Wilt Chamberlain* (2)	Philadelphia Warriors	(United States) **Bill Russell*** (4)	Boston Celtics
1960–61	Guard	(United States) Bob Cousy* (10)	Boston Celtics	(United States) Larry Costello*	Syracuse Nationals
1960–61	Guard	(United States) Oscar Robertson*	Cincinnati Royals	(United States) Gene Shue (2)	Detroit Pistons
1961–62	Forward	(United States) Bob Pettit* (8)	St. Louis Hawks	(United States) Tom Heinsohn* (2)	Boston Celtics
1961–62	Forward	(United States) Elgin Baylor* (4)	Los Angeles Lakers	(United States) Jack Twyman* (2)	Cincinnati Royals
1961–62	Center	(United States) Wilt Chamberlain* (3)	Philadelphia Warriors	(United States) **Bill Russell*** (5)	Boston Celtics
1961–62	Guard	(United States) Jerry West*	Los Angeles Lakers	(United States) Richie Guerin* (3)	New York Knicks
1961–62	Guard	(United States) Oscar Robertson* (2)	Cincinnati Royals	(United States) Bob Cousy* (11)	Boston Celtics
1962–63	Forward	(United States) Elgin Baylor* (5)	Los Angeles Lakers	(United States) Tom Heinsohn* (3)	Boston Celtics
1962–63	Forward	(United States) Bob Pettit* (9)	St. Louis Hawks	(United States) Bailey Howell*	Detroit Pistons
1962–63	Center	(United States) **Bill Russell*** (6)	Boston Celtics	(United States) Wilt Chamberlain* (4)	San Francisco Warriors
1962–63	Guard	(United States) Oscar Robertson* (3)	Cincinnati Royals	(United States) Bob Cousy* (12)	Boston Celtics
1962–63	Guard	(United States) Jerry West* (2)	Los Angeles Lakers	(United States) Hal Greer*	Syracuse Nationals
1963–64	Forward	(United States) Elgin Baylor* (6)	Los Angeles Lakers	(United States) Tom Heinsohn* (4)	Boston Celtics
1963–64	Forward	(United States) Bob Pettit* (10)	St. Louis Hawks	(United States) Jerry Lucas*	Cincinnati Royals
1963–64	Center	(United States) Wilt Chamberlain* (5)	San Francisco Warriors	(United States) Bill Russell* (7)	Boston Celtics
1963–64	Guard	(United States) **Oscar Robertson*** (4)	Cincinnati Royals	(United States) John Havlicek*	Boston Celtics
1963–64	Guard	(United States) Jerry West* (3)	Los Angeles Lakers	(United States) Hal Greer* (2)	Philadelphia 76ers
1964–65	Forward	(United States) Elgin Baylor* (7)	Los Angeles Lakers	(United States) Bob Pettit* (11)	St. Louis Hawks
1964–65	Forward	(United States) Jerry Lucas* (2)	Cincinnati Royals	(United States) Gus Johnson*	Baltimore Bullets
1964–65	Center	(United States) **Bill Russell*** (8)	Boston Celtics	(United States) Wilt Chamberlain* (6)	Philadelphia 76ers
1964–65	Guard	(United States) Oscar Robertson* (5)	Cincinnati Royals	(United States) Sam Jones*	Boston Celtics
1964–65	Guard	(United States) Jerry West* (4)	Los Angeles Lakers	(United States) Hal Greer* (3)	Philadelphia 76ers
1965–66	Forward	(United States) Rick Barry*	San Francisco Warriors	(United States) John Havlicek* (2)	Boston Celtics
1965–66	Forward	(United States) Jerry Lucas* (3)	Cincinnati Royals	(United States) Gus Johnson* (2)	Baltimore Bullets
1965–66	Center	(United States) **Wilt Chamberlain*** (7)	Philadelphia 76ers	(United States) Bill Russell* (9)	Boston Celtics
1965–66	Guard	(United States) Oscar Robertson* (6)	Cincinnati Royals	(United States) Sam Jones* (2)	Boston Celtics
1965–66	Guard	(United States) Jerry West* (5)	Los Angeles Lakers	(United States) Hal Greer* (4)	Philadelphia 76ers
1966–67	Forward	(United States) Rick Barry* (2)	San Francisco Warriors	(United States) Willis Reed*	New York Knicks
1966–67	Forward	(United States) Elgin Baylor* (8)	Los Angeles Lakers	(United States) Jerry Lucas* (4)	Cincinnati Royals
1966–67	Center	(United States) **Wilt Chamberlain*** (8)	Philadelphia 76ers	(United States) Bill Russell* (10)	Boston Celtics
1966–67	Guard	(United States) Jerry West* (6)	Los Angeles Lakers	(United States) Hal Greer* (5)	Philadelphia 76ers
1966–67	Guard	(United States) Oscar Robertson* (7)	Cincinnati Royals	(United States) Sam Jones* (3)	Boston Celtics
1967–68	Forward	(United States) Elgin Baylor* (9)	Los Angeles Lakers	(United States) Willis Reed* (2)	New York Knicks
1967–68	Forward	(United States) Jerry Lucas* (5)	Cincinnati Royals	(United States) John Havlicek* (3)	Boston Celtics
1967–68	Center	(United States) **Wilt Chamberlain*** (9)	Philadelphia 76ers	(United States) Bill Russell* (11)	Boston Celtics
1967–68	Guard	(United States) Dave Bing*	Detroit Pistons	(United States) Hal Greer* (6)	Philadelphia 76ers
1967–68	Guard	(United States) Oscar Robertson* (8)	Cincinnati Royals	(United States) Jerry West* (7)	Los Angeles Lakers
1968–69	Forward	(United States) Billy Cunningham*	Philadelphia 76ers	(United States) John Havlicek* (4)	Boston Celtics
1968–69	Forward	(United States) Elgin Baylor* (10)	Los Angeles Lakers	(United States) Dave DeBusschere*	New York Knicks
1968–69	Center	(United States) **Wes Unseld***	Baltimore Bullets	(United States) Willis Reed* (3)	New York Knicks
1968–69	Guard	(United States) Earl Monroe*	Baltimore Bullets	(United States) Hal Greer* (7)	Philadelphia 76ers
1968–69	Guard	(United States) Oscar Robertson* (9)	Cincinnati Royals	(United States) Jerry West* (8)	Los Angeles Lakers
1969–70	Forward	(United States) Billy Cunningham* (2)	Philadelphia 76ers	(United States) John Havlicek* (5)	Boston Celtics
1969–70	Forward	(United States) Connie Hawkins*	Phoenix Suns	(United States) Gus Johnson* (3)	Baltimore Bullets
1969–70	Center	(United States) **Willis Reed*** (4)	New York Knicks	(United States) Lew Alcindor* (Note: Before the 1971–72 season, Lew Alcindor changed his name to Kareem Abdul-Jabbar.)	Milwaukee Bucks
1969–70	Guard	(United States) Jerry West* (9)	Los Angeles Lakers	(United States) Lou Hudson*	Atlanta Hawks
1969–70	Guard	(United States) Walt Frazier*	New York Knicks	(United States) Oscar Robertson* (10)	Cincinnati Royals
1970–71	Forward	(United States) John Havlicek* (6)	Boston Celtics	(United States) Gus Johnson* (4)	Baltimore Bullets
1970–71	Forward	(United States) Billy Cunningham* (3)	Philadelphia 76ers	(United States) Bob Love	Chicago Bulls
1970–71	Center	(United States) **Lew Alcindor*** (2)	Milwaukee Bucks	(United States) Willis Reed* (5)	New York Knicks
1970–71	Guard	(United States) Jerry West* (10)	Los Angeles Lakers	(United States) Walt Frazier* (2)	New York Knicks
1970–71	Guard	(United States) Dave Bing* (2)	Detroit Pistons	(United States) Oscar Robertson* (11)	Milwaukee Bucks
1971–72	Forward	(United States) John Havlicek* (7)	Boston Celtics	(United States) Bob Love (2)	Chicago Bulls
1971–72	Forward	(United States) Spencer Haywood*	Seattle SuperSonics	(United States) Billy Cunningham* (4)	Philadelphia 76ers
1971–72	Center	(United States) **Kareem Abdul-Jabbar*** (3)	Milwaukee Bucks	(United States) Wilt Chamberlain* (10)	Los Angeles Lakers
1971–72	Guard	(United States) Jerry West* (11)	Los Angeles Lakers	(United States) Nate Archibald*	Cincinnati Royals
1971–72	Guard	(United States) Walt Frazier* (3)	New York Knicks	(United States) Archie Clark	Baltimore Bullets
1972–73	Forward	(United States) John Havlicek* (8)	Boston Celtics	(United States) Elvin Hayes*	Baltimore Bullets
1972–73	Forward	(United States) Spencer Haywood* (2)	Seattle SuperSonics	(United States) Rick Barry* (3)	Golden State Warriors
1972–73	Center	(United States) Kareem Abdul-Jabbar* (4)	Milwaukee Bucks	(United States) **Dave Cowens***	Boston Celtics
1972–73	Guard	(United States) Nate Archibald* (2)	Kansas City-Omaha Kings	(United States) Walt Frazier* (4)	New York Knicks
1972–73	Guard	(United States) Jerry West* (12)	Los Angeles Lakers	(United States) Pete Maravich*	Atlanta Hawks
1973–74	Forward	(United States) John Havlicek* (9)	Boston Celtics	(United States) Elvin Hayes* (2)	Capital Bullets
1973–74	Forward	(United States) Rick Barry* (4)	Golden State Warriors	(United States) Spencer Haywood* (3)	Seattle SuperSonics
1973–74	Center	(United States) **Kareem Abdul-Jabbar*** (5)	Milwaukee Bucks	(United States) Bob McAdoo*	Buffalo Braves
1973–74	Guard	(United States) Walt Frazier* (5)	New York Knicks	(United States) Dave Bing* (3)	Detroit Pistons
1973–74	Guard	(United States) Gail Goodrich*	Los Angeles Lakers	(United States) Norm Van Lier	Chicago Bulls
1974–75	Forward	(United States) Rick Barry* (5)	Golden State Warriors	(United States) John Havlicek* (10)	Boston Celtics
1974–75	Forward	(United States) Elvin Hayes* (3)	Washington Bullets	(United States) Spencer Haywood* (4)	Seattle SuperSonics
1974–75	Center	(United States) **Bob McAdoo*** (2)	Buffalo Braves	(United States) Dave Cowens* (2)	Boston Celtics
1974–75	Guard	(United States) Nate Archibald* (3)	Kansas City-Omaha Kings	(United States) Phil Chenier	Washington Bullets
1974–75	Guard	(United States) Walt Frazier* (6)	New York Knicks	(United States) Jo Jo White*	Boston Celtics
1975–76	Forward	(United States) Rick Barry* (6)	Golden State Warriors	(United States) Elvin Hayes* (4)	Washington Bullets
1975–76	Forward	(United States) George McGinnis*	Philadelphia 76ers	(United States) John Havlicek* (11)	Boston Celtics
1975–76	Center	(United States) **Kareem Abdul-Jabbar*** (6)	Los Angeles Lakers	(United States) Dave Cowens* (3)	Boston Celtics
1975–76	Guard	(United States) Nate Archibald* (4)	Kansas City Kings	(United States) Randy Smith	Buffalo Braves
1975–76	Guard	(United States) Pete Maravich* (2)	New Orleans Jazz	(United States) Phil Smith	Golden State Warriors
1976–77	Forward	(United States) Elvin Hayes* (5)	Washington Bullets	(United States) Julius Erving*	Philadelphia 76ers
1976–77	Forward	(United States) David Thompson*	Denver Nuggets	(United States) George McGinnis* (2)	Philadelphia 76ers
1976–77	Center	(United States) **Kareem Abdul-Jabbar*** (7)	Los Angeles Lakers	(United States) Bill Walton*	Portland Trail Blazers
1976–77	Guard	(United States) Pete Maravich* (3)	New Orleans Jazz	(United States) George Gervin*	San Antonio Spurs
1976–77	Guard	(United States) Paul Westphal*	Phoenix Suns	(United States) Jo Jo White* (2)	Boston Celtics
1977–78	Forward	(United States) Truck Robinson	New Orleans Jazz	(United States) Walter Davis*	Phoenix Suns
1977–78	Forward	(United States) Julius Erving* (2)	Philadelphia 76ers	(United States) Maurice Lucas	Portland Trail Blazers
1977–78	Center	(United States) **Bill Walton*** (2)	Portland Trail Blazers	(United States) Kareem Abdul-Jabbar* (8)	Los Angeles Lakers
1977–78	Guard	(United States) George Gervin* (2)	San Antonio Spurs	(United States) Paul Westphal* (2)	Phoenix Suns
1977–78	Guard	(United States) David Thompson* (2)	Denver Nuggets	(United States) Pete Maravich* (4)	New Orleans Jazz
1978–79	Forward	(United States) Marques Johnson	Milwaukee Bucks	(United States) Walter Davis* (2)	Phoenix Suns
1978–79	Forward	(United States) Elvin Hayes* (6)	Washington Bullets	(United States) Bob Dandridge*	Washington Bullets
1978–79	Center	(United States) **Moses Malone***	Houston Rockets	(United States) Kareem Abdul-Jabbar* (9)	Los Angeles Lakers
1978–79	Guard	(United States) George Gervin* (3)	San Antonio Spurs	(United States) Lloyd Free	San Diego Clippers
1978–79	Guard	(United States) Paul Westphal* (3)	Phoenix Suns	(United States) Phil Ford	Kansas City Kings
1979–80	Forward	(United States) Julius Erving* (3)	Philadelphia 76ers	(United States) Dan Roundfield	Atlanta Hawks
1979–80	Forward	(United States) Larry Bird*	Boston Celtics	(United States) Marques Johnson (2)	Milwaukee Bucks
1979–80	Center	(United States) **Kareem Abdul-Jabbar*** (10)	Los Angeles Lakers	(United States) Moses Malone* (2)	Houston Rockets
1979–80	Guard	(United States) George Gervin* (4)	San Antonio Spurs	(United States) Dennis Johnson*	Seattle SuperSonics
1979–80	Guard	(United States) Paul Westphal* (4)	Phoenix Suns	(United States) Gus Williams	Seattle SuperSonics
1980–81	Forward	(United States) **Julius Erving*** (4)	Philadelphia 76ers	(United States) Marques Johnson (3)	Milwaukee Bucks
1980–81	Forward	(United States) Larry Bird* (2)	Boston Celtics	(United States) Adrian Dantley*	Utah Jazz
1980–81	Center	(United States) Kareem Abdul-Jabbar* (11)	Los Angeles Lakers	(United States) Moses Malone* (3)	Houston Rockets
1980–81	Guard	(United States) George Gervin* (5)	San Antonio Spurs	(United States) Otis Birdsong	Kansas City Kings
1980–81	Guard	(United States) Dennis Johnson* (2)	Phoenix Suns	(United States) Nate Archibald* (5)	Boston Celtics
1981–82	Forward	(United States) Larry Bird* (3)	Boston Celtics	(United States) Alex English*	Denver Nuggets
1981–82	Forward	(United States) Julius Erving* (5)	Philadelphia 76ers	(United States) Bernard King*	Golden State Warriors
1981–82	Center	(United States) **Moses Malone*** (4)	Houston Rockets	(United States) Robert Parish*	Boston Celtics
1981–82	Guard	(United States) George Gervin* (6)	San Antonio Spurs	(United States) Magic Johnson*	Los Angeles Lakers
1981–82	Guard	(United States) Gus Williams (2)	Seattle SuperSonics	(United States) Sidney Moncrief*	Milwaukee Bucks
1982–83	Forward	(United States) Larry Bird* (4)	Boston Celtics	(United States) Alex English* (2)	Denver Nuggets
1982–83	Forward	(United States) Julius Erving* (6)	Philadelphia 76ers	(United States) Buck Williams	New Jersey Nets
1982–83	Center	(United States) **Moses Malone*** (5)	Philadelphia 76ers	(United States) Kareem Abdul-Jabbar* (12)	Los Angeles Lakers
1982–83	Guard	(United States) Magic Johnson* (2)	Los Angeles Lakers	(United States) George Gervin* (7)	San Antonio Spurs
1982–83	Guard	(United States) Sidney Moncrief* (2)	Milwaukee Bucks	(United States) Isiah Thomas*	Detroit Pistons
1983–84	Forward	(United States) **Larry Bird*** (5)	Boston Celtics	(United States) Adrian Dantley* (2)	Utah Jazz
1983–84	Forward	(United States) Bernard King* (2)	New York Knicks	(United States) Julius Erving* (7)	Philadelphia 76ers
1983–84	Center	(United States) Kareem Abdul-Jabbar* (13)	Los Angeles Lakers	(United States) Moses Malone* (6)	Philadelphia 76ers
1983–84	Guard	(United States) Magic Johnson* (3)	Los Angeles Lakers	(United States) Sidney Moncrief* (3)	Milwaukee Bucks
1983–84	Guard	(United States) Isiah Thomas* (2)	Detroit Pistons	(United States) Jim Paxson	Portland Trail Blazers
1984–85	Forward	(United States) **Larry Bird*** (6)	Boston Celtics	(United States) Terry Cummings	Milwaukee Bucks
1984–85	Forward	(United States) Bernard King* (3)	New York Knicks	(United States) Ralph Sampson*	Houston Rockets
1984–85	Center	(United States) Moses Malone* (7)	Philadelphia 76ers	(United States) Kareem Abdul-Jabbar* (14)	Los Angeles Lakers
1984–85	Guard	(United States) Magic Johnson* (4)	Los Angeles Lakers	(United States) Michael Jordan*	Chicago Bulls
1984–85	Guard	(United States) Isiah Thomas* (3)	Detroit Pistons	(United States) Sidney Moncrief* (4)	Milwaukee Bucks
1985–86	Forward	(United States) **Larry Bird*** (7)	Boston Celtics	(United States) Charles Barkley*	Philadelphia 76ers
1985–86	Forward	(United States) Dominique Wilkins* (Note: Dominique Wilkins, who was born in Paris, settled down in America, and has played for the USA Basketball National Team.)	Atlanta Hawks	(United States) Alex English* (3)	Denver Nuggets
1985–86	Center	(United States) Kareem Abdul-Jabbar* (15)	Los Angeles Lakers	(Nigeria) Akeem Olajuwon* (Note: When Olajuwon arrived in the United States, the University of Houston incorrectly spelled his first name "Akeem". He used that spelling until March 9, 1991, when he announced that he would add an H.)	Houston Rockets
1985–86	Guard	(United States) Magic Johnson* (5)	Los Angeles Lakers	(United States) Sidney Moncrief* (5)	Milwaukee Bucks
1985–86	Guard	(United States) Isiah Thomas* (4)	Detroit Pistons	(United States) Alvin Robertson	San Antonio Spurs
1986–87	Forward	(United States) Larry Bird* (8)	Boston Celtics	(United States) Dominique Wilkins* (2)	Atlanta Hawks
1986–87	Forward	(United States) Kevin McHale*	Boston Celtics	(United States) Charles Barkley* (2)	Philadelphia 76ers
1986–87	Center	(Nigeria) Akeem Olajuwon* (2)	Houston Rockets	(United States) Moses Malone* (8)	Washington Bullets
1986–87	Guard	(United States) **Magic Johnson*** (6)	Los Angeles Lakers	(United States) Isiah Thomas* (5)	Detroit Pistons
1986–87	Guard	(United States) Michael Jordan* (2)	Chicago Bulls	(United States) Fat Lever	Denver Nuggets
1987–88	Forward	(United States) Larry Bird* (9)	Boston Celtics	(United States) Karl Malone*	Utah Jazz
1987–88	Forward	(United States) Charles Barkley* (3)	Philadelphia 76ers	(United States) Dominique Wilkins* (3)	Atlanta Hawks
1987–88	Center	(Nigeria) Akeem Olajuwon* (3)	Houston Rockets	(Jamaica) Patrick Ewing*	New York Knicks
1987–88	Guard	(United States) **Michael Jordan*** (3)	Chicago Bulls	(United States) Clyde Drexler*	Portland Trail Blazers
1987–88	Guard	(United States) Magic Johnson* (7)	Los Angeles Lakers	(United States) John Stockton*	Utah Jazz

=== 1988–89 to 2022–23 ===
From the 1988–89 season through the 2022–23 season, the All-NBA Team was composed of three teams, each with five roster spots, except when there were ties. Players were selected with regard to position.

Season	Positions	First team		Second team		Third team	
Season	Positions	Players	Teams	Players	Teams	Players	Teams
1988–89	Forward	(United States) Karl Malone* (2)	Utah Jazz	(United States) Tom Chambers	Phoenix Suns	(United States) Dominique Wilkins* (4)	Atlanta Hawks
1988–89	Forward	(United States) Charles Barkley* (4)	Philadelphia 76ers	(United States) Chris Mullin*	Golden State Warriors	(United States) Terry Cummings (2)	Milwaukee Bucks
1988–89	Center	(Nigeria) Akeem Olajuwon* (4)	Houston Rockets	(Jamaica) Patrick Ewing* (2)	New York Knicks	(United States) Robert Parish* (2)	Boston Celtics
1988–89	Guard	(United States) Michael Jordan* (4)	Chicago Bulls	(United States) John Stockton* (2)	Utah Jazz	(United States) Dale Ellis	Seattle SuperSonics
1988–89	Guard	(United States) **Magic Johnson*** (8)	Los Angeles Lakers	(United States) Kevin Johnson	Phoenix Suns	(United States) Mark Price	Cleveland Cavaliers
1989–90	Forward	(United States) Karl Malone* (3)	Utah Jazz	(United States) Larry Bird* (10)	Boston Celtics	(United States) James Worthy*	Los Angeles Lakers
1989–90	Forward	(United States) Charles Barkley* (5)	Philadelphia 76ers	(United States) Tom Chambers (2)	Phoenix Suns	(United States) Chris Mullin* (2)	Golden State Warriors
1989–90	Center	(Jamaica) Patrick Ewing* (3)	New York Knicks	(Nigeria) Akeem Olajuwon* (5)	Houston Rockets	(United States) David Robinson*	San Antonio Spurs
1989–90	Guard	(United States) **Magic Johnson*** (9)	Los Angeles Lakers	(United States) John Stockton* (3)	Utah Jazz	(United States) Clyde Drexler* (2)	Portland Trail Blazers
1989–90	Guard	(United States) Michael Jordan* (5)	Chicago Bulls	(United States) Kevin Johnson (2)	Phoenix Suns	(United States) Joe Dumars*	Detroit Pistons
1990–91	Forward	(United States) Karl Malone* (4)	Utah Jazz	(United States) Dominique Wilkins* (5)	Atlanta Hawks	(United States) James Worthy* (2)	Los Angeles Lakers
1990–91	Forward	(United States) Charles Barkley* (6)	Philadelphia 76ers	(United States) Chris Mullin* (3)	Golden State Warriors	(United States) Bernard King* (4)	Washington Bullets
1990–91	Center	(United States) David Robinson* (2)	San Antonio Spurs	(Jamaica) Patrick Ewing* (4)	New York Knicks	(Nigeria) Hakeem Olajuwon* (6)	Houston Rockets
1990–91	Guard	(United States) **Michael Jordan*** (6)	Chicago Bulls	(United States) Kevin Johnson (3)	Phoenix Suns	(United States) John Stockton* (4)	Utah Jazz
1990–91	Guard	(United States) Magic Johnson* (10)	Los Angeles Lakers	(United States) Clyde Drexler* (3)	Portland Trail Blazers	(United States) Joe Dumars* (2)	Detroit Pistons
1991–92	Forward	(United States) Karl Malone* (5)	Utah Jazz	(United States) Scottie Pippen*	Chicago Bulls	(United States) Dennis Rodman*	Detroit Pistons
1991–92	Forward	(United States) Chris Mullin* (4)	Golden State Warriors	(United States) Charles Barkley* (7)	Philadelphia 76ers	(United States) Kevin Willis	Atlanta Hawks
1991–92	Center	(United States) David Robinson* (3)	San Antonio Spurs	(Jamaica) Patrick Ewing* (5)	New York Knicks	(United States) Brad Daugherty	Cleveland Cavaliers
1991–92	Guard	(United States) **Michael Jordan*** (7)	Chicago Bulls	(United States) Tim Hardaway*	Golden State Warriors	(United States) Mark Price (2)	Cleveland Cavaliers
1991–92	Guard	(United States) Clyde Drexler* (4)	Portland Trail Blazers	(United States) John Stockton* (5)	Utah Jazz	(United States) Kevin Johnson (4)	Phoenix Suns
1992–93	Forward	(United States) **Charles Barkley*** (8)	Phoenix Suns	(United States) Dominique Wilkins* (6)	Atlanta Hawks	(United States) Scottie Pippen* (2)	Chicago Bulls
1992–93	Forward	(United States) Karl Malone* (6)	Utah Jazz	(United States) Larry Johnson	Charlotte Hornets	(United States) Derrick Coleman	New Jersey Nets
1992–93	Center	(Nigeria) Hakeem Olajuwon* (7)	Houston Rockets	(Jamaica) Patrick Ewing* (6)	New York Knicks	(United States) David Robinson* (4)	San Antonio Spurs
1992–93	Guard	(United States) Michael Jordan* (8)	Chicago Bulls	(United States) John Stockton* (6)	Utah Jazz	(United States) Tim Hardaway* (2)	Golden State Warriors
1992–93	Guard	(United States) Mark Price (3)	Cleveland Cavaliers	(United States) Joe Dumars* (3)	Detroit Pistons	(Croatia) Dražen Petrović*	New Jersey Nets
1993–94	Forward	(United States) Scottie Pippen* (3)	Chicago Bulls	(United States) Shawn Kemp	Seattle SuperSonics	(United States) Derrick Coleman (2)	New Jersey Nets
1993–94	Forward	(United States) Karl Malone* (7)	Utah Jazz	(United States) Charles Barkley* (9)	Phoenix Suns	(United States) Dominique Wilkins* (7)	Atlanta Hawks; Los Angeles Clippers
1993–94	Center	(Nigeria) **Hakeem Olajuwon*** (8)	Houston Rockets	(United States) David Robinson* (5)	San Antonio Spurs	(United States) Shaquille O'Neal*	Orlando Magic
1993–94	Guard	(United States) John Stockton* (7)	Utah Jazz	(United States) Mitch Richmond*	Sacramento Kings	(United States) Mark Price (4)	Cleveland Cavaliers
1993–94	Guard	(United States) Latrell Sprewell	Golden State Warriors	(United States) Kevin Johnson (5)	Phoenix Suns	(United States) Gary Payton*	Seattle SuperSonics
1994–95	Forward	(United States) Karl Malone* (8)	Utah Jazz	(United States) Charles Barkley* (10)	Phoenix Suns	(Germany) Detlef Schrempf	Seattle SuperSonics
1994–95	Forward	(United States) Scottie Pippen* (4)	Chicago Bulls	(United States) Shawn Kemp (2)	Seattle SuperSonics	(United States) Dennis Rodman* (2)	San Antonio Spurs
1994–95	Center	(United States) **David Robinson*** (6)	San Antonio Spurs	(United States) Shaquille O'Neal* (2)	Orlando Magic	(Nigeria) Hakeem Olajuwon* (9)	Houston Rockets
1994–95	Guard	(United States) John Stockton* (8)	Utah Jazz	(United States) Gary Payton* (2)	Seattle SuperSonics	(United States) Reggie Miller*	Indiana Pacers
1994–95	Guard	(United States) Penny Hardaway	Orlando Magic	(United States) Mitch Richmond* (2)	Sacramento Kings	(United States) Clyde Drexler* (5)	Houston Rockets
1995–96	Forward	(United States) Scottie Pippen* (5)	Chicago Bulls	(United States) Shawn Kemp (3)	Seattle SuperSonics	(United States) Charles Barkley* (11)	Phoenix Suns
1995–96	Forward	(United States) Karl Malone* (9)	Utah Jazz	(United States) Grant Hill*	Detroit Pistons	(United States) Juwan Howard	Washington Bullets
1995–96	Center	(United States) David Robinson* (7)	San Antonio Spurs	(Nigeria) Hakeem Olajuwon* (10)	Houston Rockets	(United States) Shaquille O'Neal* (3)	Orlando Magic
1995–96	Guard	(United States) **Michael Jordan*** (9)	Chicago Bulls	(United States) Gary Payton* (3)	Seattle SuperSonics	(United States) Mitch Richmond* (3)	Sacramento Kings
1995–96	Guard	(United States) Penny Hardaway (2)	Orlando Magic	(United States) John Stockton* (9)	Utah Jazz	(United States) Reggie Miller* (2)	Indiana Pacers
1996–97	Forward	(United States) **Karl Malone*** (10)	Utah Jazz	(United States) Scottie Pippen* (6)	Chicago Bulls	(United States) Anthony Mason	Charlotte Hornets
1996–97	Forward	(United States) Grant Hill* (2)	Detroit Pistons	(United States) Glen Rice	Charlotte Hornets	(United States) Vin Baker	Milwaukee Bucks
1996–97	Center	(Nigeria) Hakeem Olajuwon* (11)	Houston Rockets	(Jamaica) Patrick Ewing* (7)	New York Knicks	(United States) Shaquille O'Neal* (4)	Los Angeles Lakers
1996–97	Guard	(United States) Michael Jordan* (10)	Chicago Bulls	(United States) Gary Payton* (4)	Seattle SuperSonics	(United States) John Stockton* (10)	Utah Jazz
1996–97	Guard	(United States) Tim Hardaway* (3)	Miami Heat	(United States) Mitch Richmond* (4)	Sacramento Kings	(United States) Penny Hardaway (3)	Orlando Magic
1997–98	Forward	(United States) Karl Malone* (11)	Utah Jazz	(United States) Grant Hill* (3)	Detroit Pistons	(United States) Scottie Pippen* (7)	Chicago Bulls
1997–98	Forward	(United States Virgin Islands) Tim Duncan* (Note: Although Tim Duncan was born in the U.S. Virgin Islands and is a United States citizen, the NBA considers him an international player.)	San Antonio Spurs	(United States) Vin Baker (2)	Seattle SuperSonics	(United States) Glen Rice (2)	Charlotte Hornets
1997–98	Center	(United States) Shaquille O'Neal* (5)	Los Angeles Lakers	(United States) David Robinson* (8)	San Antonio Spurs	(Democratic Republic of the Congo) Dikembe Mutombo*	Atlanta Hawks
1997–98	Guard	(United States) **Michael Jordan*** (11)	Chicago Bulls	(United States) Tim Hardaway* (4)	Miami Heat	(United States) Mitch Richmond* (5)	Sacramento Kings
1997–98	Guard	(United States) Gary Payton* (5)	Seattle SuperSonics	(United States) Rod Strickland	Washington Wizards	(United States) Reggie Miller* (3)	Indiana Pacers
1998–99	Forward	(United States) **Karl Malone*** (12)	Utah Jazz	(United States) Chris Webber*	Sacramento Kings	(United States) Kevin Garnett*	Minnesota Timberwolves
1998–99	Forward	(United States Virgin Islands) Tim Duncan* (2)	San Antonio Spurs	(United States) Grant Hill* (4)	Detroit Pistons	(United States) Antonio McDyess	Denver Nuggets
1998–99	Center	(United States) Alonzo Mourning*	Miami Heat	(United States) Shaquille O'Neal* (6)	Los Angeles Lakers	(Nigeria) Hakeem Olajuwon* (12)	Houston Rockets
1998–99	Guard	(United States) Allen Iverson*	Philadelphia 76ers	(United States) Gary Payton* (6)	Seattle SuperSonics	(United States) Kobe Bryant*	Los Angeles Lakers
1998–99	Guard	(United States) Jason Kidd*	Phoenix Suns	(United States) Tim Hardaway* (5)	Miami Heat	(United States) John Stockton* (11)	Utah Jazz
1999–00	Forward	(United States Virgin Islands) Tim Duncan* (3)	San Antonio Spurs	(United States) Karl Malone* (13)	Utah Jazz	(United States) Chris Webber* (2)	Sacramento Kings
1999–00	Forward	(United States) Kevin Garnett* (2)	Minnesota Timberwolves	(United States) Grant Hill* (5)	Detroit Pistons	(United States) Vince Carter*	Toronto Raptors
1999–00	Center	(United States) **Shaquille O'Neal*** (7)	Los Angeles Lakers	(United States) Alonzo Mourning* (2)	Miami Heat	(United States) David Robinson* (9)	San Antonio Spurs
1999–00	Guard	(United States) Jason Kidd* (2)	Phoenix Suns	(United States) Allen Iverson* (2)	Philadelphia 76ers	(United States) Eddie Jones	Charlotte Hornets
1999–00	Guard	(United States) Gary Payton* (7)	Seattle SuperSonics	(United States) Kobe Bryant* (2)	Los Angeles Lakers	(United States) Stephon Marbury	New Jersey Nets
2000–01	Forward	(United States Virgin Islands) Tim Duncan* (4)	San Antonio Spurs	(United States) Kevin Garnett* (3)	Minnesota Timberwolves	(United States) Karl Malone* (14)	Utah Jazz
2000–01	Forward	(United States) Chris Webber* (3)	Sacramento Kings	(United States) Vince Carter* (2)	Toronto Raptors	(Germany) Dirk Nowitzki*	Dallas Mavericks
2000–01	Center	(United States) Shaquille O'Neal* (8)	Los Angeles Lakers	(Democratic Republic of the Congo) Dikembe Mutombo* (2)	Atlanta Hawks; Philadelphia 76ers	(United States) David Robinson* (10)	San Antonio Spurs
2000–01	Guard	(United States) **Allen Iverson*** (3)	Philadelphia 76ers	(United States) Kobe Bryant* (3)	Los Angeles Lakers	(United States) Gary Payton* (8)	Seattle SuperSonics
2000–01	Guard	(United States) Jason Kidd* (3)	Phoenix Suns	(United States) Tracy McGrady*	Orlando Magic	(United States) Ray Allen*	Milwaukee Bucks
2001–02	Forward	(United States Virgin Islands) **Tim Duncan*** (5)	San Antonio Spurs	(United States) Kevin Garnett* (4)	Minnesota Timberwolves	(United States) Ben Wallace*	Detroit Pistons
2001–02	Forward	(United States) Tracy McGrady* (2)	Orlando Magic	(United States) Chris Webber* (4)	Sacramento Kings	(United States) Jermaine O'Neal	Indiana Pacers
2001–02	Center	(United States) Shaquille O'Neal* (9)	Los Angeles Lakers	(Germany) Dirk Nowitzki* (2)	Dallas Mavericks	(Democratic Republic of the Congo) Dikembe Mutombo* (3)	Philadelphia 76ers
2001–02	Guard	(United States) Jason Kidd* (4)	New Jersey Nets	(United States) Gary Payton* (9)	Seattle SuperSonics	(United States) Paul Pierce*	Boston Celtics
2001–02	Guard	(United States) Kobe Bryant* (4)	Los Angeles Lakers	(United States) Allen Iverson* (4)	Philadelphia 76ers	(Canada) Steve Nash* (Note: Steve Nash, who was born in South Africa, was raised in Canada.)	Dallas Mavericks
2002–03	Forward	(United States Virgin Islands) **Tim Duncan*** (6)	San Antonio Spurs	(Germany) Dirk Nowitzki* (3)	Dallas Mavericks	(United States) Paul Pierce* (2)	Boston Celtics
2002–03	Forward	(United States) Kevin Garnett* (5)	Minnesota Timberwolves	(United States) Chris Webber* (5)	Sacramento Kings	(United States) Jamal Mashburn	New Orleans Hornets
2002–03	Center	(United States) Shaquille O'Neal* (10)	Los Angeles Lakers	(United States) Ben Wallace* (2)	Detroit Pistons	(United States) Jermaine O'Neal (2)	Indiana Pacers
2002–03	Guard	(United States) Kobe Bryant* (5)	Los Angeles Lakers	(United States) Jason Kidd* (5)	New Jersey Nets	(United States) Stephon Marbury (2)	Phoenix Suns
2002–03	Guard	(United States) Tracy McGrady* (3)	Orlando Magic	(United States) Allen Iverson* (5)	Philadelphia 76ers	(Canada) Steve Nash* (2)	Dallas Mavericks
2003–04	Forward	(United States) **Kevin Garnett*** (6)	Minnesota Timberwolves	(United States) Jermaine O'Neal (3)	Indiana Pacers	(Germany) Dirk Nowitzki* (4)	Dallas Mavericks
2003–04	Forward	(United States Virgin Islands) Tim Duncan* (7)	San Antonio Spurs	(Serbia and Montenegro) Peja Stojaković	Sacramento Kings	(United States) Ron Artest (Note: Ron Artest has changed his name twice: first, to Metta World Peace on September 16, 2011, and later, to Metta Sandiford-Artest sometime before May 5, 2020.)	Indiana Pacers
2003–04	Center	(United States) Shaquille O'Neal* (11)	Los Angeles Lakers	(United States) Ben Wallace* (3)	Detroit Pistons	(China) Yao Ming*	Houston Rockets
2003–04	Guard	(United States) Kobe Bryant* (6)	Los Angeles Lakers	(United States) Sam Cassell	Minnesota Timberwolves	(United States) Michael Redd	Milwaukee Bucks
2003–04	Guard	(United States) Jason Kidd* (6)	New Jersey Nets	(United States) Tracy McGrady* (4)	Orlando Magic	(United States) Baron Davis	New Orleans Hornets
2004–05	Forward	(United States Virgin Islands) Tim Duncan* (8)	San Antonio Spurs	(United States) LeBron James^	Cleveland Cavaliers	(United States) Tracy McGrady* (5)	Houston Rockets
2004–05	Forward	(Germany) Dirk Nowitzki* (5)	Dallas Mavericks	(United States) Kevin Garnett* (7)	Minnesota Timberwolves	(United States) Shawn Marion	Phoenix Suns
2004–05	Center	(United States) Shaquille O'Neal* (12)	Miami Heat	(United States) Amare Stoudemire* (Note: Amar'e Stoudemire's first name had previously been spelled incorrectly as "Amaré" or "Amare" since joining the NBA, but was changed to "Amar'e" in October 2008.)	Phoenix Suns	(United States) Ben Wallace* (4)	Detroit Pistons
2004–05	Guard	(United States) Allen Iverson* (6)	Philadelphia 76ers	(United States) Dwyane Wade*	Miami Heat	(United States) Kobe Bryant* (7)	Los Angeles Lakers
2004–05	Guard	(Canada) **Steve Nash*** (3)	Phoenix Suns	(United States) Ray Allen* (2)	Seattle SuperSonics	(United States) Gilbert Arenas	Washington Wizards
2005–06	Forward	(United States) LeBron James^ (2)	Cleveland Cavaliers	(United States) Elton Brand	Los Angeles Clippers	(United States) Shawn Marion (2)	Phoenix Suns
2005–06	Forward	(Germany) Dirk Nowitzki* (6)	Dallas Mavericks	(United States Virgin Islands) Tim Duncan* (9)	San Antonio Spurs	(United States) Carmelo Anthony*	Denver Nuggets
2005–06	Center	(United States) Shaquille O'Neal* (13)	Miami Heat	(United States) Ben Wallace* (5)	Detroit Pistons	(China) Yao Ming* (2)	Houston Rockets
2005–06	Guard	(United States) Kobe Bryant* (8)	Los Angeles Lakers	(United States) Chauncey Billups*	Detroit Pistons	(United States) Allen Iverson* (7)	Philadelphia 76ers
2005–06	Guard	(Canada) **Steve Nash*** (4)	Phoenix Suns	(United States) Dwyane Wade* (2)	Miami Heat	(United States) Gilbert Arenas (2)	Washington Wizards
2006–07	Forward	(Germany) **Dirk Nowitzki*** (7)	Dallas Mavericks	(United States) LeBron James^ (3)	Cleveland Cavaliers	(United States) Kevin Garnett* (8)	Minnesota Timberwolves
2006–07	Forward	(United States Virgin Islands) Tim Duncan* (10)	San Antonio Spurs	(United States) Chris Bosh*	Toronto Raptors	(United States) Carmelo Anthony* (2)	Denver Nuggets
2006–07	Center	(United States) Amare Stoudemire* (2)	Phoenix Suns	(China) Yao Ming* (3)	Houston Rockets	(United States) Dwight Howard*	Orlando Magic
2006–07	Guard	(Canada) Steve Nash* (5)	Phoenix Suns	(United States) Gilbert Arenas (3)	Washington Wizards	(United States) Dwyane Wade* (3)	Miami Heat
2006–07	Guard	(United States) Kobe Bryant* (9)	Los Angeles Lakers	(United States) Tracy McGrady* (6)	Houston Rockets	(United States) Chauncey Billups* (2)	Detroit Pistons
2007–08	Forward	(United States) Kevin Garnett* (9)	Boston Celtics	(Germany) Dirk Nowitzki* (8)	Dallas Mavericks	(United States) Carlos Boozer	Utah Jazz
2007–08	Forward	(United States) LeBron James^ (4)	Cleveland Cavaliers	(United States Virgin Islands) Tim Duncan* (11)	San Antonio Spurs	(United States) Paul Pierce* (3)	Boston Celtics
2007–08	Center	(United States) Dwight Howard* (2)	Orlando Magic	(United States) Amare Stoudemire* (3)	Phoenix Suns	(China) Yao Ming* (4)	Houston Rockets
2007–08	Guard	(United States) **Kobe Bryant*** (10)	Los Angeles Lakers	(Canada) Steve Nash* (6)	Phoenix Suns	(United States) Tracy McGrady* (7)	Houston Rockets
2007–08	Guard	(United States) Chris Paul^{†}	New Orleans Hornets	(United States) Deron Williams	Utah Jazz	(Argentina) Manu Ginóbili*	San Antonio Spurs
2008–09	Forward	(Germany) Dirk Nowitzki* (9)	Dallas Mavericks	(United States) Paul Pierce* (4)	Boston Celtics	(Spain) Pau Gasol*	Los Angeles Lakers
2008–09	Forward	(United States) **LeBron James**^ (5)	Cleveland Cavaliers	(United States Virgin Islands) Tim Duncan* (12)	San Antonio Spurs	(United States) Carmelo Anthony* (3)	Denver Nuggets
2008–09	Center	(United States) Dwight Howard* (3)	Orlando Magic	(China) Yao Ming* (5)	Houston Rockets	(United States) Shaquille O'Neal* (14)	Phoenix Suns
2008–09	Guard	(United States) Kobe Bryant* (11)	Los Angeles Lakers	(United States) Brandon Roy	Portland Trail Blazers	(United States) Chauncey Billups* (3)	Denver Nuggets
2008–09	Guard	(United States) Dwyane Wade* (4)	Miami Heat	(United States) Chris Paul^{†} (2)	New Orleans Hornets	(France) Tony Parker* (Note: Tony Parker was born in Belgium. He holds French citizenship and plays for their national team.)	San Antonio Spurs
2009–10	Forward	(United States) Kevin Durant^	Oklahoma City Thunder	(United States) Carmelo Anthony* (4)	Denver Nuggets	(Spain) Pau Gasol* (2)	Los Angeles Lakers
2009–10	Forward	(United States) **LeBron James**^ (6)	Cleveland Cavaliers	(Germany) Dirk Nowitzki* (10)	Dallas Mavericks	(United States Virgin Islands) Tim Duncan* (13)	San Antonio Spurs
2009–10	Center	(United States) Dwight Howard* (4)	Orlando Magic	(United States) Amar'e Stoudemire* (4)	Phoenix Suns	(Australia) Andrew Bogut	Milwaukee Bucks
2009–10	Guard	(United States) Kobe Bryant* (12)	Los Angeles Lakers	(United States) Deron Williams (2)	Utah Jazz	(United States) Joe Johnson	Atlanta Hawks
2009–10	Guard	(United States) Dwyane Wade* (5)	Miami Heat	(Canada) Steve Nash* (7)	Phoenix Suns	(United States) Brandon Roy (2)	Portland Trail Blazers
2010–11	Forward	(United States) Kevin Durant^ (2)	Oklahoma City Thunder	(Spain) Pau Gasol* (3)	Los Angeles Lakers	(United States) LaMarcus Aldridge	Portland Trail Blazers
2010–11	Forward	(United States) LeBron James^ (7)	Miami Heat	(Germany) Dirk Nowitzki* (11)	Dallas Mavericks	(United States) Zach Randolph	Memphis Grizzlies
2010–11	Center	(United States) Dwight Howard* (5)	Orlando Magic	(United States) Amar'e Stoudemire* (5)	New York Knicks	(Dominican Republic) Al Horford^	Atlanta Hawks
2010–11	Guard	(United States) Kobe Bryant* (13)	Los Angeles Lakers	(United States) Dwyane Wade* (6)	Miami Heat	(Argentina) Manu Ginóbili* (2)	San Antonio Spurs
2010–11	Guard	(United States) **Derrick Rose**^{§}	Chicago Bulls	(United States) Russell Westbrook^{†}	Oklahoma City Thunder	(United States) Chris Paul^{†} (3)	New Orleans Hornets
2011–12	Forward	(United States) **LeBron James**^ (8)	Miami Heat	(United States) Kevin Love^{†}	Minnesota Timberwolves	(United States) Carmelo Anthony* (5)	New York Knicks
2011–12	Forward	(United States) Kevin Durant^ (3)	Oklahoma City Thunder	(United States) Blake Griffin	Los Angeles Clippers	(Germany) Dirk Nowitzki* (12)	Dallas Mavericks
2011–12	Center	(United States) Dwight Howard* (6)	Orlando Magic	(United States) Andrew Bynum	Los Angeles Lakers	(United States) Tyson Chandler	New York Knicks
2011–12	Guard	(United States) Kobe Bryant* (14)	Los Angeles Lakers	(France) Tony Parker* (2)	San Antonio Spurs	(United States) Dwyane Wade* (7)	Miami Heat
2011–12	Guard	(United States) Chris Paul^{†} (4)	Los Angeles Clippers	(United States) Russell Westbrook^{†} (2)	Oklahoma City Thunder	(United States) Rajon Rondo	Boston Celtics
2012–13	Forward	(United States) **LeBron James**^ (9)	Miami Heat	(United States) Carmelo Anthony* (6)	New York Knicks	(United States) David Lee	Golden State Warriors
2012–13	Forward	(United States) Kevin Durant^ (4)	Oklahoma City Thunder	(United States) Blake Griffin (2)	Los Angeles Clippers	(United States) Paul George^	Indiana Pacers
2012–13	Center	(United States Virgin Islands) Tim Duncan* (14)	San Antonio Spurs	(Spain) Marc Gasol	Memphis Grizzlies	(United States) Dwight Howard* (7)	Los Angeles Lakers
2012–13	Guard	(United States) Kobe Bryant* (15)	Los Angeles Lakers	(France) Tony Parker* (3)	San Antonio Spurs	(United States) Dwyane Wade* (8)	Miami Heat
2012–13	Guard	(United States) Chris Paul^{†} (5)	Los Angeles Clippers	(United States) Russell Westbrook^{†} (3)	Oklahoma City Thunder	(United States) James Harden^	Houston Rockets
2013–14	Forward	(United States) **Kevin Durant**^ (5)	Oklahoma City Thunder	(United States) Blake Griffin (3)	Los Angeles Clippers	(United States) Paul George^ (2)	Indiana Pacers
2013–14	Forward	(United States) LeBron James^ (10)	Miami Heat	(United States) Kevin Love^{†} (2)	Minnesota Timberwolves	(United States) LaMarcus Aldridge (2)	Portland Trail Blazers
2013–14	Center	(France) Joakim Noah	Chicago Bulls	(United States) Dwight Howard* (8)	Houston Rockets	(United States) Al Jefferson	Charlotte Bobcats
2013–14	Guard	(United States) James Harden^ (2)	Houston Rockets	(United States) Stephen Curry^	Golden State Warriors	(Slovenia) Goran Dragić	Phoenix Suns
2013–14	Guard	(United States) Chris Paul^{†} (6)	Los Angeles Clippers	(France) Tony Parker* (4)	San Antonio Spurs	(United States) Damian Lillard^	Portland Trail Blazers
2014–15	Forward	(United States) LeBron James^ (11)	Cleveland Cavaliers	(United States) LaMarcus Aldridge (3)	Portland Trail Blazers	(United States) Blake Griffin (4)	Los Angeles Clippers
2014–15	Forward	(United States) Anthony Davis^	New Orleans Pelicans	(Spain) Pau Gasol* (4)	Chicago Bulls	(United States Virgin Islands) Tim Duncan* (15)	San Antonio Spurs
2014–15	Center	(Spain) Marc Gasol (2)	Memphis Grizzlies	(United States) DeMarcus Cousins	Sacramento Kings	(United States) DeAndre Jordan^	Los Angeles Clippers
2014–15	Guard	(United States) James Harden^ (3)	Houston Rockets	(United States) Russell Westbrook^{†} (4)	Oklahoma City Thunder	(United States) Klay Thompson^	Golden State Warriors
2014–15	Guard	(United States) **Stephen Curry**^ (2)	Golden State Warriors	(United States) Chris Paul^{†} (7)	Los Angeles Clippers	(United States) Kyrie Irving^ (Note: Kyrie Irving, who was born in Australia, was raised in America, and has played for the USA Basketball National Team.)	Cleveland Cavaliers
2015–16	Forward	(United States) Kawhi Leonard^	San Antonio Spurs	(United States) Kevin Durant^ (6)	Oklahoma City Thunder	(United States) Paul George^ (3)	Indiana Pacers
2015–16	Forward	(United States) LeBron James^ (12)	Cleveland Cavaliers	(United States) Draymond Green^	Golden State Warriors	(United States) LaMarcus Aldridge (4)	San Antonio Spurs
2015–16	Center	(United States) DeAndre Jordan^ (2)	Los Angeles Clippers	(United States) DeMarcus Cousins (2)	Sacramento Kings	(United States) Andre Drummond^	Detroit Pistons
2015–16	Guard	(United States) **Stephen Curry**^ (3)	Golden State Warriors	(United States) Damian Lillard^ (2)	Portland Trail Blazers	(United States) Klay Thompson^ (2)	Golden State Warriors
2015–16	Guard	(United States) Russell Westbrook^{†} (5)	Oklahoma City Thunder	(United States) Chris Paul^{†} (8)	Los Angeles Clippers	(United States) Kyle Lowry^{†}	Toronto Raptors
2016–17	Forward	(United States) Kawhi Leonard^ (2)	San Antonio Spurs	(United States) Kevin Durant^ (7)	Golden State Warriors	(United States) Jimmy Butler^	Chicago Bulls
2016–17	Forward	(United States) LeBron James^ (13)	Cleveland Cavaliers	(Greece) Giannis Antetokounmpo^	Milwaukee Bucks	(United States) Draymond Green^ (2)	Golden State Warriors
2016–17	Center	(United States) Anthony Davis^ (2)	New Orleans Pelicans	(France) Rudy Gobert^	Utah Jazz	(United States) DeAndre Jordan^ (3)	Los Angeles Clippers
2016–17	Guard	(United States) James Harden^ (4)	Houston Rockets	(United States) Stephen Curry^ (4)	Golden State Warriors	(United States) John Wall	Washington Wizards
2016–17	Guard	(United States) **Russell Westbrook**^{†} (6)	Oklahoma City Thunder	(United States) Isaiah Thomas^{§}	Boston Celtics	(United States) DeMar DeRozan^	Toronto Raptors
2017–18	Forward	(United States) Kevin Durant^ (8)	Golden State Warriors	(United States) LaMarcus Aldridge (5)	San Antonio Spurs	(United States) Jimmy Butler^ (2)	Minnesota Timberwolves
2017–18	Forward	(United States) LeBron James^ (14)	Cleveland Cavaliers	(Greece) Giannis Antetokounmpo^ (2)	Milwaukee Bucks	(United States) Paul George^ (4)	Oklahoma City Thunder
2017–18	Center	(United States) Anthony Davis^ (3)	New Orleans Pelicans	(Cameroon) Joel Embiid^	Philadelphia 76ers	(Dominican Republic) Karl-Anthony Towns^	Minnesota Timberwolves
2017–18	Guard	(United States) **James Harden**^ (5)	Houston Rockets	(United States) DeMar DeRozan^ (2)	Toronto Raptors	(United States) Victor Oladipo^{§}	Indiana Pacers
2017–18	Guard	(United States) Damian Lillard^ (3)	Portland Trail Blazers	(United States) Russell Westbrook^{†} (7)	Oklahoma City Thunder	(United States) Stephen Curry^ (5)	Golden State Warriors
2018–19	Forward	(Greece) **Giannis Antetokounmpo**^ (3)	Milwaukee Bucks	(United States) Kevin Durant^ (9)	Golden State Warriors	(United States) Blake Griffin (5)	Detroit Pistons
2018–19	Forward	(United States) Paul George^ (5)	Oklahoma City Thunder	(United States) Kawhi Leonard^ (3)	Toronto Raptors	(United States) LeBron James^ (15)	Los Angeles Lakers
2018–19	Center	(Serbia) Nikola Jokić^	Denver Nuggets	(Cameroon) Joel Embiid^ (2)	Philadelphia 76ers	(France) Rudy Gobert^ (2)	Utah Jazz
2018–19	Guard	(United States) James Harden^ (6)	Houston Rockets	(United States) Damian Lillard^ (4)	Portland Trail Blazers	(United States) Russell Westbrook^{†} (8)	Oklahoma City Thunder
2018–19	Guard	(United States) Stephen Curry^ (6)	Golden State Warriors	(United States) Kyrie Irving^ (2)	Boston Celtics	(United States) Kemba Walker	Charlotte Hornets
2019–20	Forward	(United States) LeBron James^ (16)	Los Angeles Lakers	(United States) Kawhi Leonard^ (4)	Los Angeles Clippers	(United States) Jimmy Butler^ (3)	Miami Heat
2019–20	Forward	(Greece) **Giannis Antetokounmpo**^ (4)	Milwaukee Bucks	(Cameroon) Pascal Siakam^	Toronto Raptors	(United States) Jayson Tatum^	Boston Celtics
2019–20	Center	(United States) Anthony Davis^ (4)	Los Angeles Lakers	(Serbia) Nikola Jokić^ (2)	Denver Nuggets	(France) Rudy Gobert^ (3)	Utah Jazz
2019–20	Guard	(United States) James Harden^ (7)	Houston Rockets	(United States) Damian Lillard^ (5)	Portland Trail Blazers	(Australia) Ben Simmons^	Philadelphia 76ers
2019–20	Guard	(Slovenia) Luka Dončić^	Dallas Mavericks	(United States) Chris Paul^{†} (9)	Oklahoma City Thunder	(United States) Russell Westbrook^{†} (9)	Houston Rockets
2020–21	Forward	(Greece) Giannis Antetokounmpo^ (5)	Milwaukee Bucks	(United States) LeBron James^ (17)	Los Angeles Lakers	(United States) Jimmy Butler^ (4)	Miami Heat
2020–21	Forward	(United States) Kawhi Leonard^ (5)	Los Angeles Clippers	(United States) Julius Randle^	New York Knicks	(United States) Paul George^ (6)	Los Angeles Clippers
2020–21	Center	(Serbia) **Nikola Jokić**^ (3)	Denver Nuggets	(Cameroon) Joel Embiid^ (3)	Philadelphia 76ers	(France) Rudy Gobert^ (4)	Utah Jazz
2020–21	Guard	(United States) Stephen Curry^ (7)	Golden State Warriors	(United States) Damian Lillard^ (6)	Portland Trail Blazers	(United States) Bradley Beal^	Washington Wizards
2020–21	Guard	(Slovenia) Luka Dončić^ (2)	Dallas Mavericks	(United States) Chris Paul^{†} (10)	Phoenix Suns	(United States) Kyrie Irving^ (3)	Brooklyn Nets
2021–22	Forward	(Greece) Giannis Antetokounmpo^ (6)	Milwaukee Bucks	(United States) DeMar DeRozan^ (3)	Chicago Bulls	(United States) LeBron James^ (18)	Los Angeles Lakers
2021–22	Forward	(United States) Jayson Tatum^ (2)	Boston Celtics	(United States) Kevin Durant^ (10)	Brooklyn Nets	(Cameroon) Pascal Siakam^ (2)	Toronto Raptors
2021–22	Center	(Serbia) **Nikola Jokić**^ (4)	Denver Nuggets	(Cameroon) Joel Embiid^ (4)	Philadelphia 76ers	(Dominican Republic) Karl-Anthony Towns^ (2)	Minnesota Timberwolves
2021–22	Guard	(United States) Devin Booker^	Phoenix Suns	(United States) Stephen Curry^ (8)	Golden State Warriors	(United States) Chris Paul^{†} (11)	Phoenix Suns
2021–22	Guard	(Slovenia) Luka Dončić^ (3)	Dallas Mavericks	(United States) Ja Morant^	Memphis Grizzlies	(United States) Trae Young^	Atlanta Hawks
2022–23	Forward	(Greece) Giannis Antetokounmpo^ (7)	Milwaukee Bucks	(United States) Jimmy Butler^ (5)	Miami Heat	(United States) LeBron James^ (19)	Los Angeles Lakers
2022–23	Forward	(United States) Jayson Tatum^ (3)	Boston Celtics	(United States) Jaylen Brown^	Boston Celtics	(United States) Julius Randle^ (2)	New York Knicks
2022–23	Center	(Cameroon) **Joel Embiid**^ (5)	Philadelphia 76ers	(Serbia) Nikola Jokić^ (5)	Denver Nuggets	(Lithuania) Domantas Sabonis^	Sacramento Kings
2022–23	Guard	(Slovenia) Luka Dončić^ (4)	Dallas Mavericks	(United States) Stephen Curry^ (9)	Golden State Warriors	(United States) De'Aaron Fox^	Sacramento Kings
2022–23	Guard	(Canada) Shai Gilgeous-Alexander^	Oklahoma City Thunder	(United States) Donovan Mitchell^	Cleveland Cavaliers	(United States) Damian Lillard^ (7)	Portland Trail Blazers

=== 2023–24 to present ===
Starting with the 2023–24 season, the All-NBA Team consists of three teams selected without regard to position, each with five roster spots, except when there are ties. Players will be listed in order of points received in voting; those tied on points will be listed in alphabetic order by family name.

Season	First team		Second team		Third team	
Season	Players	Teams	Players	Teams	Players	Teams
2023–24	(Canada) Shai Gilgeous-Alexander^ (2)	Oklahoma City Thunder	(United States) Jalen Brunson^	New York Knicks	(United States) LeBron James^ (20)	Los Angeles Lakers
2023–24	(Serbia) **Nikola Jokić**^ (6)	Denver Nuggets	(United States) Anthony Edwards^	Minnesota Timberwolves	(United States) Stephen Curry^ (10)	Golden State Warriors
2023–24	(Slovenia) Luka Dončić^ (5)	Dallas Mavericks	(United States) Kevin Durant^ (11)	Phoenix Suns	(Lithuania) Domantas Sabonis^ (2)	Sacramento Kings
2023–24	(Greece) Giannis Antetokounmpo^ (8)	Milwaukee Bucks	(United States) Kawhi Leonard^ (6)	Los Angeles Clippers	(United States) Tyrese Haliburton^	Indiana Pacers
2023–24	(United States) Jayson Tatum^ (4)	Boston Celtics	(United States) Anthony Davis^ (5)	Los Angeles Lakers	(United States) Devin Booker^ (2)	Phoenix Suns
2024–25	(Greece) Giannis Antetokounmpo^ (9)	Milwaukee Bucks	(United States) Anthony Edwards^ (2)	Minnesota Timberwolves	(United States) Cade Cunningham^	Detroit Pistons
2024–25	(Canada) **Shai Gilgeous-Alexander**^ (3)	Oklahoma City Thunder	(United States) LeBron James^ (21)	Los Angeles Lakers	(Dominican Republic) Karl-Anthony Towns^ (3)	New York Knicks
2024–25	(Serbia) Nikola Jokić^ (7)	Denver Nuggets	(United States) Stephen Curry^ (11)	Golden State Warriors	(United States) Tyrese Haliburton^ (2)	Indiana Pacers
2024–25	(United States) Jayson Tatum^ (5)	Boston Celtics	(United States) Evan Mobley^	Cleveland Cavaliers	(United States) Jalen Williams^	Oklahoma City Thunder
2024–25	(United States) Donovan Mitchell^ (2)	Cleveland Cavaliers	(United States) Jalen Brunson^ (2)	New York Knicks	(United States) James Harden^ (8)	Los Angeles Clippers
2025–26	(Canada) **Shai Gilgeous-Alexander**^ (4)	Oklahoma City Thunder	(United States) Jaylen Brown^ (2)	Boston Celtics	(United States) Tyrese Maxey^	Philadelphia 76ers
2025–26	(Serbia) Nikola Jokić^ (8)	Denver Nuggets	(United States) Kawhi Leonard^ (7)	Los Angeles Clippers	(Canada) Jamal Murray^	Denver Nuggets
2025–26	(France) Victor Wembanyama^	San Antonio Spurs	(United States) Donovan Mitchell^ (3)	Cleveland Cavaliers	(United States) Jalen Johnson^	Atlanta Hawks
2025–26	(Slovenia) Luka Dončić^ (6)	Los Angeles Lakers	(United States) Kevin Durant^ (12)	Houston Rockets	(United States) Jalen Duren^	Detroit Pistons
2025–26	(United States) Cade Cunningham^ (2)	Detroit Pistons	(United States) Jalen Brunson^ (3)	New York Knicks	(United States) Chet Holmgren^	Oklahoma City Thunder

== Most selections ==
The following table only lists players with at least ten total selections.

*	Denotes players inducted to the Naismith Memorial Basketball Hall of Fame
^	Denotes players who are still active in the NBA

Player	Total	First team	Second team	Third team	MVP	Seasons
(United States) LeBron James^	21	13	4	4	4	23
(United States) Kobe Bryant*	15	11	2	2	1	20
(United States) Kareem Abdul-Jabbar*	15	10	5	0	6	20
(United States Virgin Islands) Tim Duncan*	15	10	3	2	2	19
(United States) Karl Malone*	14	11	2	1	2	19
(United States) Shaquille O'Neal*	14	8	2	4	1	19
(United States) Bob Cousy*	12	10	2	0	1	13
(United States) Jerry West*	12	10	2	0	0	14
(United States) Kevin Durant^	12	6	6	0	1	19
(United States) Dolph Schayes*	12	6	6	0	0	16
(Nigeria) Hakeem Olajuwon*	12	6	3	3	1	18
(Germany) Dirk Nowitzki*	12	4	5	3	1	21
(United States) Michael Jordan*	11	10	1	0	5	15
(United States) Bob Pettit*	11	10	1	0	2	11
(United States) Oscar Robertson*	11	9	2	0	1	14
(United States) Charles Barkley*	11	5	5	1	1	16
(United States) John Havlicek*	11	4	7	0	0	16
(United States) Stephen Curry^	11	4	5	2	2	17
(United States) Chris Paul^{†}	11	4	5	2	0	20
(United States) Bill Russell*	11	3	8	0	5	13
(United States) John Stockton*	11	2	6	3	0	19
(United States) Elgin Baylor*	10	10	0	0	0	14
(United States) Larry Bird*	10	9	1	0	3	13
(United States) Magic Johnson*	10	9	1	0	3	13
(United States) Wilt Chamberlain*	10	7	3	0	4	14
(United States) David Robinson*	10	4	2	4	1	14

== See also ==
- NBA All-Defensive Team
- All-ABA Team
- All-National Basketball League (United States) Team
- All-NBA G League Team
- List of NBA regular season records
