= 2001–02 Pepperdine Waves men's basketball team =

American college basketball season

2001–02 Pepperdine Waves men's basketball

WCC regular season champions

NCAA tournament, First round
- Conference: West Coast Conference
- Record: 22–9 (13–1 WCC)
- Head coach: Paul Westphal (1st season)
- Home arena: Firestone Fieldhouse

2001–02 West Coast Conference men's basketball standings
	Conf.				Overall
Team	W		L	PCT	W		L	PCT
Pepperdine	13	–	1	.929	22	–	9	.710
No. 6 Gonzaga †	13	–	1	.929	29	–	4	.879
Santa Clara	8	–	6	.571	13	–	15	.464
San Francisco	8	–	6	.571	13	–	15	.464
San Diego	7	–	7	.500	16	–	13	.552
Saint Mary's	3	–	11	.214	9	–	20	.310
Loyola Marymount	2	–	12	.143	9	–	20	.310
Portland	2	–	12	.143	6	–	24	.200
† 2002 WCC tournament winner Rankings from AP Poll

The 2001–02 Pepperdine Waves men's basketball team represented Pepperdine University in the 2001–02 NCAA Division I men's basketball season. The team was led by first-year head coach Paul Westphal. The Waves played their home games at the Firestone Fieldhouse and were members of the West Coast Conference. They finished the season 22–9, 13–1 in WCC play to win the regular season conference title. Pepperdine lost in the championship game of the West Coast Conference tournament, but did receive an at-large bid to the NCAA tournament as No. 10 seed in the Midwest region. In the opening round, the Waves lost to No. 7 seed Wake Forest in the opening round, 83–74.

== Roster ==
2001–02 Pepperdine Waves men's basketball team
Players	Coaches
Pos. / # / Name / Height / Weight / Year / Previous school / Hometown; F / 32 / Jimmy Miggins / 6 ft 6 in (1.98 m) / 190 lb (86 kg) / Jr / / Riverside, California	Head coach: Paul Westphal; Assistant coach(es) Legend: (C) Team captain; (S) Suspended; (I) Ineligible; (W) Walk-on; Injured; Current redshirt

== Schedule and results ==
Date time, TV	Rank^{#}	Opponent^{#}	Result	Record	Site (attendance) city, state
Non-conference regular season
Nov 17, 2001*		Cal State Fullerton	W 75–58	1–0	Firestone Fieldhouse; Malibu, California
Nov 20, 2001*		at UC Irvine	L 93–96 ^{2OT}	1–1	Bren Events Center; Irvine, California
Nov 28, 2001*		at No. 10 UCLA	W 85–78	2–1	Pauley Pavilion (8,376); Los Angeles, California
Dec 1, 2001*; 6:00 p.m.		at Utah	L 74–81	2–2	Jon M. Huntsman Center; Salt Lake City, Utah
Dec 4, 2001*		Long Beach State	W 93–83	3–2	Firestone Fieldhouse; Malibu, California
Dec 6, 2001*		vs. USC	W 78–77	4–2	The Forum; Inglewood, California
Dec 8, 2001*		at UC Santa Barbara	L 51–68	4–3	The Thunderdome; Santa Barbara, California
Dec 14, 2001*		at Oregon	L 64–88	4–4	McArthur Court; Eugene, Oregon
Dec 17, 2001*		Georgia	L 74–91	4–5	Firestone Fieldhouse; Malibu, California
Dec 21, 2001*		Point Loma Nazarene	W 98–55	5–5	Firestone Fieldhouse; Malibu, California
Dec 28, 2001*		at No. 14 Arizona; Fiesta Bowl Classic	L 71–94	5–6	McKale Center (14,566); Tucson, Arizona
Dec 30, 2001*		vs. West Virginia; Fiesta Bowl Classic	W 97–65	6–6	McKale Center; Tucson, Arizona
Jan 5, 2002*		BYU	W 82–79 ^{OT}	7–6	Firestone Fieldhouse; Malibu, California
WCC Regular Season
Jan 11, 2002		at Saint Mary's	W 67–51	8–6 (1–0)	McKeon Pavilion; Moraga, California
Jan 12, 2002		at San Francisco	W 74–68	9–6 (2–0)	War Memorial Gymnasium; San Francisco, California
Jan 18, 2002*		No. 13 Gonzaga	W 88–79	10–6 (3–0)	Firestone Fieldhouse; Malibu, California
Jan 19, 2002		Portland	W 109–88	11–6 (4–0)	Firestone Fieldhouse; Malibu, California
Jan 24, 2002		at Santa Clara	W 74–67	12–6 (5–0)	Leavey Center; Santa Clara, California
Jan 26, 2002		at San Diego	W 96–91 ^{2OT}	13–6 (6–0)	Jenny Craig Pavilion; San Diego, California
Jan 30, 2002		Loyola Marymount	W 84–59	14–6 (7–0)	Firestone Fieldhouse; Malibu, California
Feb 2, 2002		at Loyola Marymount	W 89–79	15–6 (8–0)	Gersten Pavilion; Los Angeles, California
Feb 8, 2002		San Francisco	W 79–72	16–6 (9–0)	Firestone Fieldhouse; Malibu, California
Feb 9, 2002		Saint Mary's	W 68–57	17–6 (10–0)	Firestone Fieldhouse; Malibu, California
Feb 14, 2002		at Portland	W 83–77	18–6 (11–0)	Chiles Center; Portland, Oregon
Feb 16, 2002		at No. 8 Gonzaga	L 78–91	18–7 (11–1)	Charlotte Y. Martin Centre; Spokane, Washington
Feb 22, 2002		San Diego	W 90–79	19–7 (12–1)	Firestone Fieldhouse; Malibu, California
Feb 23, 2002		Santa Clara	W 96–58	20–7 (13–1)	Firestone Fieldhouse; Malibu, California
WCC tournament
Mar 2, 2002*	(1)	vs. (8) Portland; Quarterfinals	W 77–64	21–7	Jenny Craig Pavilion; San Diego, California
Mar 3, 2002*	(1)	vs. (6) Saint Mary's; Semifinals	W 68–47	22–7	Jenny Craig Pavilion; San Diego, California
Mar 4, 2002*	(1)	vs. (2) No. 6 Gonzaga; Championship game	L 90–96	22–8	Jenny Craig Pavilion; San Diego, California
NCAA tournament
Mar 14, 2002*	(10 MW)	vs. (7 MW) Wake Forest; First round	L 74–83	22–9	ARCO Arena; Sacramento, California
*Non-conference game. ^{#}Rankings from AP poll. (#) Tournament seedings in parentheses. MW=Midwest.
