= 2002 West Coast Conference men's basketball tournament =

- Classification: Division I
- Season: 2001–02
- Teams: 8
- Site: Jenny Craig Pavilion; San Diego, California
- Champions: Gonzaga (5th title)
- Winning coach: Mark Few (3rd title)
- MVP: Dan Dickau (Gonzaga)
- Television: ESPN2, ESPN

2001–02 West Coast Conference men's basketball standings
| | Conf. | | | | Overall |
| Team | W | | L | PCT | W | | L | PCT |
|---|---|---|---|---|---|---|---|---|
| Pepperdine | 13 | – | 1 | .929 | 22 | – | 9 | .710 |
| No. 6 Gonzaga † | 13 | – | 1 | .929 | 29 | – | 4 | .879 |
| Santa Clara | 8 | – | 6 | .571 | 13 | – | 15 | .464 |
| San Francisco | 8 | – | 6 | .571 | 13 | – | 15 | .464 |
| San Diego | 7 | – | 7 | .500 | 16 | – | 13 | .552 |
| Saint Mary's | 3 | – | 11 | .214 | 9 | – | 20 | .310 |
| Loyola Marymount | 2 | – | 12 | .143 | 9 | – | 20 | .310 |
| Portland | 2 | – | 12 | .143 | 6 | – | 24 | .200 |
† 2002 WCC tournament winner Rankings from AP Poll

The 2002 West Coast Conference men's basketball tournament took place March 2–4, 2002. All rounds were held in San Diego, California at the Jenny Craig Pavilion. The semifinals were televised by ESPN2. The West Coast Conference Championship Game was televised by ESPN.

The Gonzaga Bulldogs earned their fourth straight WCC Tournament title and an automatic bid to the 2002 NCAA tournament. Dan Dickau of Gonzaga was named Tournament MVP for the second straight year.

== Format ==
With eight teams participating, all eight teams were placed into the first round, with teams seeded and paired based on regular-season records. After the first round, teams were re-seeded so the highest-remaining team was paired with the lowest-remaining time in one semifinal with the other two teams slotted into the other semifinal.

== Bracket ==
Quarter finals Saturday, March 2
1 | Pepperdine | 77
8 | Portland | 64
4 | San Francisco | 67
5 | San Diego | 69
(Pairings are reseeded after the first round)
3 | Santa Clara | 67
6 | Saint Mary's | 72
2 | #7 Gonzaga | 82
7 | Loyola Marymount | 64

Semi-finals; Sunday, March 3
1 | Pepperdine | 68
6 | Saint Mary's | 47
2 | #7 Gonzaga | 87
5 | San Diego | 79

Finals; Monday, March 4
1 | Pepperdine | 90
2 | #7 Gonzaga | 96

== See also ==
- West Coast Conference
