= 2001–02 Gonzaga Bulldogs men's basketball team =

American college basketball season

2001–02 Gonzaga Bulldogs men's basketball

WCC Tournament champions WCC Regular Season Champions

NCAA tournament, Round of 64
- Conference: West Coast Conference

Ranking
- Coaches: No. 16
- AP: No. 6
- Record: 29–4 (13–1 WCC)
- Head coach: Mark Few (3rd season)
- Assistant coaches: Bill Grier (11th season); Leon Rice (3rd season); Tommy Lloyd (1st season)
- Home arena: Charlotte Y. Martin Centre

2001–02 West Coast Conference men's basketball standings
	Conf.				Overall
Team	W		L	PCT	W		L	PCT
Pepperdine	13	–	1	.929	22	–	9	.710
No. 6 Gonzaga †	13	–	1	.929	29	–	4	.879
Santa Clara	8	–	6	.571	13	–	15	.464
San Francisco	8	–	6	.571	13	–	15	.464
San Diego	7	–	7	.500	16	–	13	.552
Saint Mary's	3	–	11	.214	9	–	20	.310
Loyola Marymount	2	–	12	.143	9	–	20	.310
Portland	2	–	12	.143	6	–	24	.200
† 2002 WCC tournament winner Rankings from AP Poll

The 2001–02 Gonzaga Bulldogs men's basketball team (also informally referred to as the Zags) represented Gonzaga University in the 2001–02 NCAA Division I men's basketball season. The team was led by head coach Mark Few, in his 3rd season as head coach, and played their home games at the Charlotte Y. Martin Centre in Spokane, Washington. This was the Bulldogs' 22nd season as a member of the West Coast Conference. After winning the WCC tournament for the fourth straight season, the team earned an automatic bid to the NCAA tournament.

== Roster ==
2001–02 Gonzaga Bulldogs men's basketball team
Players
Coaches

Pos.	#	Name	Height	Weight	Year	Previous school	Hometown
G	21	Dan Dickau	6 ft 0 in (1.83 m)	180 lb (82 kg)	Sr	Prairie; Washington	Vancouver, WA
F	32	Zach Gourde	6 ft 8 in (2.03 m)	245 lb (111 kg)	RS Jr	Prairie	Vancouver, WA
G	1	Winston Brooks	6 ft 0 in (1.83 m)	198 lb (90 kg)	Jr	Huguenot; Howard College; North Idaho College	Richmond, VA
G	20	Kyle Bankhead	6 ft 0 in (1.83 m)	195 lb (88 kg)	RS So	Walla Walla	Walla Walla, WA
G	10	Blake Stepp	6 ft 4 in (1.93 m)	194 lb (88 kg)	So	South Eugene	Eugene, OR
F	33	Cory Violette	6 ft 8 in (2.03 m)	265 lb (120 kg)	So	Bishop Kelly	Boise, ID
G	14	Brian Michaelson (W)	6 ft 3 in (1.91 m)	203 lb (92 kg)	RS Fr	Jesuit	Portland, OR
F	1	Ronny Turiaf	6 ft 10 in (2.08 m)	243 lb (110 kg)	Fr	INSEP	Le Robert, Martinique

Head coach

- Mark Few

Assistant coach(es)

- Bill Grier
- Leon Rice
- Tommy Lloyd

Legend

- (C) Team captain
- (S) Suspended
- (I) Ineligible
- (W) Walk-on
- Injured
- Current redshirt

== Schedule and results ==
Date time, TV	Rank^{#}	Opponent^{#}	Result	Record	Site (attendance) city, state
Regular season
Nov 23, 2001; 6:30 p.m.		vs. Texas; Great Alaska Shootout	W 67–64	3–1	Sullivan Arena (7,922); Anchorage, AK
Feb 23, 2002	No. 7	at Saint Mary's	W 74–55	26–3 (13–1)	McKeon Pavilion (3,411); Moraga, CA
2002 West Coast Conference tournament
Mar 2, 2002*	No. 7	vs. Loyola Marymount; WCC Tournament Quarterfinal	W 82–64	27–3	Jenny Craig Pavilion (4,360); San Diego, CA
Mar 3, 2002*	No. 7	at San Diego; WCC Tournament Semifinal	W 87–79	28–3	Jenny Craig Pavilion (5,004); San Diego, CA
Mar 4, 2002*	No. 7	vs. Pepperdine; WCC Tournament Championship	W 96–90	29–3	Jenny Craig Pavilion (4,711); San Diego, CA
NCAA Division I men's basketball tournament
Mar 14, 2002*	(6 W) No. 6	vs. (11 W) Wyoming; First Round	L 66–73	29–4	The Pit/Bob King Court (15,918); Albuquerque, NM
*Non-conference game. ^{#}Rankings from AP Poll. (#) Tournament seedings in parentheses. All times are in Pacific Time.

== Awards and honors ==
- Dan Dickau – Consensus First-team All-American, WCC Player of the Year
- Mark Few – WCC Coach of the Year
