= Big Ten men's basketball tournament =

College basketball tournament

- Sport: College basketball
- Conference: Big Ten Conference
- Number of teams: 18
- Format: Single-elimination tournament
- Current stadium: Gainbridge Fieldhouse
- Current location: Indianapolis
- Played: 1998–present
- Last contest: 2026
- Current champion: Purdue (3rd title)
- Most championships: Michigan State (6)
- TV partner(s): CBS (semifinals/championship); Big Ten Network (second round, third round & quarterfinals); Peacock/NBCSN (first round, second round)
- Official website: Big Ten Men's Basketball

Sponsors
- TIAA

Host stadiums
- United Center (1998–2001, 2003, 2005, 2007, 2013, 2015, 2019, 2023, 2026); Gainbridge Fieldhouse (2002, 2004, 2006, 2008–12, 2014, 2016, 2020, 2022, 2025, 2027); Verizon Center (2017); Madison Square Garden (2018); Lucas Oil Stadium (2021); Target Center (2024); T-Mobile Arena (2028)

Penn State and Nebraska Big Ten Conference Tournament, 2017

The Big Ten men's basketball tournament is held annually at the end of the men's college basketball regular season. The tournament has been played each year since 1998. The winner of the tournament is designated the Big Ten Tournament Champion, and receives the conference's automatic bid to the NCAA tournament. The Big Ten was one of the last NCAA Division I college basketball conferences to start a tournament.

The finals of the tournament are typically held immediately before the field for the NCAA Tournament is announced, although in 2018 it was held the week before Selection Sunday.

On seven occasions, the champion of the tournament has gone on to reach the Final Four of the NCAA Tournament (Michigan State in 1999, 2000, and 2019, Illinois in 2005, Ohio State in 2007, Wisconsin in 2015, and Michigan in 2018). In 2000, champion Michigan State won the NCAA tournament. The No. 1 seed has won the tournament ten times, the most of any seed. The lowest seed to win the tournament was Michigan as a No. 8 seed in 2017. Three schools have won two consecutive championships: Michigan State (1999, 2000), Ohio State (2010, 2011), and Michigan (2017, 2018).

== Format ==
Since its creation, the tournament has included every team in the conference, except for the 2025 edition, when only 15 of the 18 eligible teams were included. Starting with the 2026 tournament, all 18 teams will be playing, which means the tournament will be completed over 6 days.

== Host ==
The Big Ten Men's Basketball tournaments have been held at neutral sites every year. The first four tournaments were held at the United Center in Chicago, Illinois. Beginning in 2002, the tournament alternated between the United Center and Conseco Fieldhouse (later known as Bankers Life Fieldhouse, and now as Gainbridge Fieldhouse) in Indianapolis, Indiana. In 2008, the tournament began a five-year stay in Indianapolis.

On June 5, 2011, the Big Ten announced that the tournament would revert to alternating between Indianapolis and Chicago. The 2013 and 2015 tournaments were played at the United Center in Chicago and the 2014 and 2016 tournaments were played at Bankers Life Fieldhouse in Indianapolis.

The 2017 tournament was held at Verizon Center in Washington, D.C. The 2018 tournament was held at Madison Square Garden in New York and held a week earlier than usual due to the Big East tournament, ending on March 4, 2018, one week before Selection Sunday.

The 2019 through 2022 Tournaments returned to alternating between the United Center in Chicago and Bankers Life Fieldhouse in Indianapolis. On February 9, 2021, it was announced that the 2021 edition would be moved from its planned location of the United Center in Chicago to Lucas Oil Stadium in Indianapolis due to health and safety protocols relating to the COVID-19 pandemic. The tournament was held at Gainbridge Fieldhouse in 2022 as planned before returning to Chicago in 2023.

On April 20, 2022, the Big Ten announced that Minneapolis will host the 2024 edition at the Target Center for the first time. On July 31, 2024, the Big Ten announced the Tournament locations from 2025 through 2028, with the 2025 and 2027 editions being held at the Gainbridge Fieldhouse, the 2026 edition being held at the United Center, and for the first time, the 2028 edition being held at the T-Mobile Arena.

== Vacated results ==
Due to various rulings against participating programs, some of the results of the Big Ten tournament have been vacated or voided. Here is a compiled list of sanctions imposed that have affected the results and records of the tournament since its inception. The information in this article does not include results of the teams in which records were vacated.

- Because of the Minnesota academic scandal, the NCAA has vacated the postseason tournament records for the Minnesota basketball team from the 1993–94 season through the 1998–99 season. Minnesota had a record of 2–1 in the 1998 tournament and went 0–1 in 1999.
- Because of the Ed Martin scandal, the NCAA vacated the records for the Michigan basketball team from the 1995–96 season through the 1998–99 season, including the 1998 and 1999 Big Ten tournaments. Michigan had won the Tournament championship in 1998 with a 3–0 record, and had a record of 1–1 in 1999.
- The NCAA has vacated most NCAA records for the Ohio State basketball team from the 1998–99 season through the 2001–02 season, including the 1999, 2001, and 2002 Big Ten tournaments. Ohio State had a record of 1–1 in the 1999 Tournament, went 0–1 in 2001, and had won the championship in 2002.

== Results ==
Year	Champion	Seed	Score	Runner-up	Seed	Most Outstanding Player	Location
1998	Michigan (Note: Due to NCAA sanctions, Michigan has vacated the records from the 1992 Final Four, the 1992–93, 1995–96, 1996–97, 1997–98, and 1998–99 seasons. See above section Vacated results)	4	76–67	Purdue	3	Robert Traylor, Michigan	United Center, Chicago
1999	Michigan State	1	67–50	Illinois	11	Mateen Cleaves, Michigan State	United Center, Chicago
2000	Michigan State	2	76–61	Illinois	4	Morris Peterson, Michigan State	United Center, Chicago
2001	Iowa	6	63–61	Indiana	4	Reggie Evans, Iowa	United Center, Chicago
2002	Ohio State (Note: Due to NCAA sanctions, Ohio State has vacated the records of 34 games in 1998–99, 16 games in 1999–00 and the entire 2000–01 and 2001–02 seasons. See above section Vacated results)	2	81–64	Iowa	9	Boban Savovic, Ohio State	Conseco Fieldhouse, Indianapolis
2003	Illinois	2	72–59	Ohio State	8	Brian Cook, Illinois	United Center, Chicago
2004	Wisconsin	2	70–53	Illinois	1	Devin Harris, Wisconsin	Conseco Fieldhouse, Indianapolis
2005	Illinois	1	54–43	Wisconsin	3	James Augustine, Illinois	United Center, Chicago
2006	Iowa	2	67–60	Ohio State	1	Jeff Horner, Iowa	Conseco Fieldhouse, Indianapolis
2007	Ohio State	1	66–49	Wisconsin	2	Greg Oden, Ohio State	United Center, Chicago
2008	Wisconsin	1	61–48	Illinois	10	Marcus Landry, Wisconsin	Conseco Fieldhouse, Indianapolis
2009	Purdue	3	65–61	Ohio State	5	Robbie Hummel, Purdue	Conseco Fieldhouse, Indianapolis
2010	Ohio State	1	90–61	Minnesota	6	Evan Turner, Ohio State	Conseco Fieldhouse, Indianapolis
2011	Ohio State	1	71–60	Penn State	6	Jared Sullinger, Ohio State	Conseco Fieldhouse, Indianapolis
2012	Michigan State	1	68–64	Ohio State	3	Draymond Green, Michigan State	Conseco Fieldhouse, Indianapolis
2013	Ohio State	2	50–43	Wisconsin	4	Aaron Craft, Ohio State	United Center, Chicago
2014	Michigan State	3	69–55	Michigan	1	Branden Dawson, Michigan State	Bankers Life Fieldhouse, Indianapolis
2015	Wisconsin	1	80–69^{OT}	Michigan State	3	Frank Kaminsky, Wisconsin	United Center, Chicago
2016	Michigan State	2	66–62	Purdue	4	Denzel Valentine, Michigan State	Bankers Life Fieldhouse, Indianapolis
2017	Michigan	8	71–56	Wisconsin	2	Derrick Walton, Michigan	Verizon Center, Washington, D.C.
2018	Michigan	5	75–66	Purdue	3	Moritz Wagner, Michigan	Madison Square Garden, New York City
2019	Michigan State	1	65–60	Michigan	3	Cassius Winston, Michigan State	United Center, Chicago
2020	Cancelled due to the COVID-19 pandemic						
2021	Illinois	2	91–88^{OT}	Ohio State	5	Ayo Dosunmu, Illinois	Lucas Oil Stadium, Indianapolis
2022	Iowa	5	75–66	Purdue	3	Keegan Murray, Iowa	Gainbridge Fieldhouse, Indianapolis
2023	Purdue	1	67–65	Penn State	10	Zach Edey, Purdue	United Center, Chicago
2024	Illinois	2	93–87	Wisconsin	5	Terrence Shannon Jr., Illinois	Target Center, Minneapolis
2025	Michigan	3	59–53	Wisconsin	5	Vladislav Goldin, Michigan	Gainbridge Fieldhouse, Indianapolis
2026	Purdue	7	80–72	Michigan	1	Braden Smith, Purdue	United Center, Chicago
2027							Gainbridge Fieldhouse, Indianapolis
2028							T-Mobile Arena, Las Vegas

=== Common matchups ===
Championship game matchups that have occurred more than once:

# of Times	Matchup	Record	Years played
4	Illinois vs. Wisconsin	Tied, 2–2	2004, 2005, 2008, 2024
3	Michigan vs. Purdue	Michigan, 2–1	1998, 2018, 2026
2	Illinois vs. Michigan State	Michigan State, 2–0	1999, 2000
2	Illinois vs. Ohio State	Illinois, 2–0	2003, 2021
2	Iowa vs. Ohio State	Tied, 1–1	2002, 2006
2	Michigan vs. Michigan State	Michigan State, 2–0	2014, 2019
2	Michigan vs. Wisconsin	Michigan, 2–0	2017, 2025
2	Ohio State vs. Wisconsin	Ohio State, 2–0	2007, 2013

== School records ==
Through 2026 tournament

School	Record	Winning Pct.	Championship game appearances	Championships	Runner-up	Championship years	Runner-up years
Michigan State	36–22	.621	7	6	1	1999, 2000, 2012, 2014, 2016, 2019	2015
Ohio State	35–21	.625	10	4	5	2002, 2007, 2010, 2011, 2013	2003, 2006, 2009, 2012, 2021
Illinois	35–24	.593	8	4	4	2003, 2005, 2021, 2024	1999, 2000, 2004, 2008
Wisconsin	34–25	.576	9	3	6	2004, 2008, 2015	2005, 2007, 2013, 2017, 2024, 2025
Purdue	25–25	.500	7	3	4	2009, 2023, 2026	1998, 2016, 2018, 2022
Michigan	30–23	.566	7	3	3	1998, 2017, 2018, 2025	2014, 2019, 2026
Iowa	24–25	.490	4	3	1	2001, 2006, 2022	2002
Penn State	21–27	.438	2	0	2		2011, 2023
Minnesota	19–26 (Note: Due to NCAA sanctions, Minnesota has vacated the records from the 1993–94, 1994–95, 1995–96, 1996–97, 1997–98, and 1998–99 seasons. See above section Vacated results)	.422	1	0	1		2010
Indiana	17–28	.378	1	0	1		2001
Washington	1–1	.500	0	0	0		
UCLA	2–2	.500	0	0	0		
Maryland	7–11	.389	0	0	0		
Rutgers	6–11	.353	0	0	0		
Oregon	1–2	.333	0	0	0		
USC	1–2	.333	0	0	0		
Northwestern	13–29	.310	0	0	0		
Nebraska	6–14	.300	0	0	0		

=== Performance by team ===
Through 2026 tournament

Teams (# of titles)		**1998**	**1999**	**2000**	**2001**	**2002**	**2003**	**2004**	**2005**	**2006**	**2007**	**2008**	**2009**	**2010**	**2011**	**2012**	**2013**	**2014**	**2015**	**2016**	**2017**	**2018**	**2019**	**2020•**	**2021**	**2022**	**2023**	**2024**
**B1G** (26)		**(11)**	**(11)**	**(11)**	**(11)**	**(11)**	**(11)**	**(11)**	**(11)**	**(11)**	**(11)**	**(11)**	**(11)**	**(11)**	**(11)**	**(12)**	**(12)**	**(12)**	**(14)**	**(14)**	**(14)**	**(14)**	**(14)**	**(14)**	**(14)**	**(14)**	**(14)**	**(14)**
1	Michigan State (6)	QF	**C**	**C**	QF	QF	SF	SF	QF	SF	QF	SF	SF	QF	SF	**C**	SF	**C**	F	**C**	QF	SF	**C**	QF	2R	SF	QF	QF
2	Ohio State (5*)	1R	SF	QF	QF	**C**	F	1R	QF	F	**C**	QF	F	**C**	**C**	F	**C**	SF	QF	QF	1R	QF	QF	2R	F	2R	SF	QF
3	Illinois (4)	SF	F	F	SF	SF	**C**	F	**C**	QF	SF	F	SF	SF	QF	1R	QF	QF	2R	QF	2R	1R	2R	QF	**C**	QF	2R	**C**
4	Michigan (4*)	**C**	QF	1R	1R	QF	QF	SF	1R	1R	QF	QF	QF	QF	SF	SF	QF	F	QF	SF	**C**	**C**	F	2R	SF	2R	2R	1R
4	Wisconsin (3)	QF	SF	SF	QF	QF	QF	**C**	F	QF	F	**C**	QF	QF	QF	SF	F	SF	**C**	2R	F	QF	SF	QF	QF	QF	1R	F
4	Iowa (3)	QF	QF	QF	**C**	F	1R	QF	SF	**C**	QF	1R	1R	1R	1R	QF	QF	1R	2R	2R	2R	2R	QF	2R	SF	**C**	2R	2R
4	Purdue (3)	F	1R	QF	QF	1R	QF	1R	1R	1R	SF	QF	**C**	SF	QF	QF	1R	1R	SF	F	QF	F	QF	2R	QF	F	**C**	SF
8	Indiana (0)	QF	QF	QF	F	SF	SF	QF	QF	SF	QF	QF	1R	1R	1R	QF	SF	1R	QF	QF	QF	2R	2R	2R	2R	SF	SF	QF
8	Minnesota (0)	SF	1R	1R	1R	QF	1R	QF	SF	QF	1R	SF	QF	F	1R	QF	1R	QF	2R	1R	SF	1R	SF	2R	2R	1R	2R	2R
8	Penn State (0)	1R	1R	SF	SF	1R	1R	1R	1R	QF	1R	1R	QF	1R	F	1R	1R	1R	QF	2R	2R	SF	2R	2R	2R	QF	F	2R
11	Northwestern (0)	1R	QF	1R	1R	1R	QF	QF	QF	1R	1R	1R	1R	QF	QF	1R	1R	QF	2R	2R	SF	2R	1R	1R	1R	2R	QF	QF
11	Nebraska (0)	•	•	•	•	•	•	•	•	•	•	•	•	•	•	1R	QF	QF	1R	QF	1R	QF	QF	1R	1R	1R	1R	SF
11	Maryland (0)	•	•	•	•	•	•	•	•	•	•	•	•	•	•	•	•	•	SF	SF	QF	2R	2R	QF	QF	2R	QF	2R
11	Rutgers (0)	•	•	•	•	•	•	•	•	•	•	•	•	•	•	•	•	•	1R	1R	2R	QF	1R	2R	QF	QF	QF	1R

Teams (# of titles)		**2025**	**2026**
**B1G** (26)		**(15)**	**(18)**
1	Michigan State (6)	SF	QF
2	Ohio State (5*)	1R	QF
3	Illinois (4)	QF	QF
4	Michigan (4*)	**C**	F
4	Wisconsin (3)	F	SF
4	Iowa (3)	2R	3R
4	Purdue (3)	QF	**C**
8	Indiana (0)	2R	2R
8	Minnesota (0)	1R	2R
8	Penn State (0)	•	1R
11	Northwestern (0)	2R	3R
11	Nebraska (0)	•	QF
11	Maryland (0)	SF	2R
11	Rutgers (0)	1R	3R
11	Washington (0)	•	3R
11	Oregon (0)	QF	1R
11	UCLA (0)	QF	SF
11	USC (0)	2R	2R

Key

**C**	Champion
F	Runner-up
SF	Semifinals
QF	Quarterfinals
RR	Round Number
•	Did not participate

The 2020 tournament was canceled after the first-round games due to the COVID-19 pandemic.

=== Records all-time by seed ===
through 2026 tournament

Seed	Record	Winning pct	Championships	Runners-up
1	45–18	.714	10	4
2	35–18	.660	8*	2
3	30–24	.556	3	7
4	16–27	.372	0*	4
5	32–26	.552	2	4
6	37–26	.587	1	2
7	25–27	.481	1	0
8	25–26	.490	1	1
9	13–28	.317	0	1
10	15–27	.357	0	2
11	13–28	.317	0	1
12	7–14	.333	0	0
13	10–12	.455	0	0
14	6–12	.333	0	0
15	3–2	.600	0	0
16	0–1	.000	0	0
17	1–1	.500	0	0
18	0–1	.000	0	0

* Does not include vacated wins by Michigan (1998) and Ohio State (2002)

=== Records by coaches ===
through 2026 tournament

Coach	School	Record	Winning pct.	Championships
Dusty May	Michigan	5–1	.833	1
Thad Matta	Ohio State	23–9	.719	4
Micah Shrewsberry	Penn State	5–2	.714	0
Bill Self	Illinois	5–2	.714	1
Steve Alford	Iowa	13–6	.684	2
John Beilein	Michigan	21–10	.677	2
Lon Kruger	Illinois	6–3	.667	0
**Tom Izzo**	**Michigan State**	**36–22**	**.621**	6
Bo Ryan	Wisconsin	17–11	.607	3
Bruce Weber	Illinois	12–8	.600	1
Chris Holtmann	Ohio State	7–5	.583	0
**Brad Underwood**	**Illinois**	**8–6**	**.571**	2
**Greg Gard**	**Wisconsin**	**13–10**	**.565**	0
**Matt Painter**	**Purdue**	**22–17**	**.564**	3
Mike Davis	Indiana	7–6	.538	0
Tubby Smith	Minnesota	7–6	.538	0
Richard Pitino	Minnesota	7–7	.500	0
Fran McCaffery	Iowa	10–13	.435	1
Tim Miles	Nebraska	5–7	.417	0
**Steve Pikiell**	**Rutgers**	**6–9**	**.400**	0
Pat Chambers	Penn State	5–8	.385	0
Ed DeChellis	Penn State	5–8	.385	0
**Chris Collins**	**Northwestern**	**7–13**	**.350**	0
Bill Carmody	Northwestern	5–13	.278	0

Note: Current coaches at school in bold. Minimum of five wins.

== See also ==
- Big Ten women's basketball tournament
