= 2002 Big Ten men's basketball tournament =

- Classification: Division I
- Season: 2001–02
- Teams: 11
- Site: Conseco Fieldhouse; Indianapolis, Indiana
- Champions: Ohio State Buckeyes (Vacated) (1st title)
- Winning coach: Jim O'Brien (1st title)
- MVP: Boban Savovic (Ohio State)

2001–02 Big Ten Conference men's basketball standings
	Conf.				Overall
Team	W		L	PCT	W		L	PCT
No. 13 Illinois	11	–	5	.688	26	–	9	.743
No. 23 Indiana	11	–	5	.688	25	–	12	.676
Wisconsin	11	–	5	.688	19	–	13	.594
Michigan State	10	–	6	.625	19	–	12	.613
Minnesota	9	–	7	.563	18	–	13	.581
Northwestern	7	–	9	.438	16	–	13	.552
Iowa	5	–	11	.313	19	–	16	.543
Purdue	5	–	11	.313	13	–	18	.419
Michigan	5	–	11	.313	11	–	18	.379
Penn State	3	–	13	.188	7	–	21	.250
No. 14 Ohio State*†	0	–	0	–	0	–	0	–
† 2002 Big Ten tournament winner Rankings from AP poll *Ohio State: 30 reg. season games; 2 NCAA Tourn. games vacated due to sanctions against the program Disputed record: Ohio State-(24-8)(11-5)

The 2002 Big Ten men's basketball tournament was the postseason men's basketball tournament for the Big Ten Conference and was played from March 7 through March 10, 2002 at Conseco Fieldhouse in Indianapolis, Indiana. The championship was won by Ohio State who defeated Iowa in the championship game. As a result, Ohio State received the Big Ten's automatic bid to the NCAA tournament.

Due to NCAA sanctions, Ohio State was forced to vacate the championship.

== Seeds ==
All Big Ten schools participated in the tournament. Teams were seeded by conference record, with a tiebreaker system used to seed teams with identical conference records. Seeding for the tournament was determined at the close of the regular conference season. The top five teams received a first round bye.

Seed	School	Conference
1	Wisconsin	11–5
2	Ohio State	11–5
3	Illinois	11–5
4	Indiana	11–5
5	Michigan State	10–6
6	Minnesota	9–7
7	Northwestern	7–9
8	Purdue	5–11
9	Iowa	5–11
10	Michigan	5–11
11	Penn State	3–13

== Bracket ==
Opening round March 7
8	Purdue	72
9	Iowa	87
7	Northwestern	51
10	Michigan	72
6	Minnesota	84
11	Penn State	60

Quarterfinals; March 8
1	Wisconsin	56
9	Iowa	58
4	#23 Indiana	67
5	Michigan State	56
2	#21 Ohio State	75
10	Michigan	68
3	#10 Illinois	92
6	Minnesota	76

Semifinals; March 9
9	Iowa	62
4	#23 Indiana	60
2	#21 Ohio State	94
3	#10 Illinois	88

Championship; March 10
9	Iowa	64
2	#21 Ohio State	81

== All-Tournament team ==
- Boban Savovic, Ohio State – Big Ten tournament Most Outstanding Player
- Brian Cook, Illinois
- Luke Recker, Iowa
- Brian Brown, Ohio State
- Brent Darby, Ohio State
