= 2001–02 Wisconsin Badgers men's basketball team =

American college basketball season

2001–02 Wisconsin Badgers men's basketball

Big Ten Regular Season Co–Champions

NCAA tournament, Round of 32
- Conference: Big Ten Conference
- Record: 19–13 (11–5 Big Ten)
- Head coach: Bo Ryan (1st season)
- Associate head coach: Rob Jeter
- Assistant coaches: Tony Bennett; Greg Gard
- Home arena: Kohl Center

2001–02 Big Ten Conference men's basketball standings
| | Conf. | | | | Overall |
| Team | W | | L | PCT | W | | L | PCT |
|---|---|---|---|---|---|---|---|---|
| No. 13 Illinois | 11 | – | 5 | .688 | 26 | – | 9 | .743 |
| No. 23 Indiana | 11 | – | 5 | .688 | 25 | – | 12 | .676 |
| Wisconsin | 11 | – | 5 | .688 | 19 | – | 13 | .594 |
| Michigan State | 10 | – | 6 | .625 | 19 | – | 12 | .613 |
| Minnesota | 9 | – | 7 | .563 | 18 | – | 13 | .581 |
| Northwestern | 7 | – | 9 | .438 | 16 | – | 13 | .552 |
| Iowa | 5 | – | 11 | .313 | 19 | – | 16 | .543 |
| Purdue | 5 | – | 11 | .313 | 13 | – | 18 | .419 |
| Michigan | 5 | – | 11 | .313 | 11 | – | 18 | .379 |
| Penn State | 3 | – | 13 | .188 | 7 | – | 21 | .250 |
| No. 14 Ohio State*† | 0 | – | 0 | – | 0 | – | 0 | – |
† 2002 Big Ten tournament winner Rankings from AP poll *Ohio State: 30 reg. season games; 2 NCAA Tourn. games vacated due to sanctions against the program Disputed record: Ohio State-(24-8)(11-5)

The 2001–02 Wisconsin Badgers men's basketball team represented University of Wisconsin–Madison. The head coach was Bo Ryan, who was coaching his first season with the Badgers. The team played its home games at the Kohl Center in Madison, Wisconsin and was a member of the Big Ten Conference. Wisconsin finished 19–13, 11–5 in Big Ten play to finish as regular season co-champions with Illinois and Indiana. The Badgers received an at-large bid to the NCAA tournament as a No. 8 seed in the East Region, where they lost to No. 1 seed and eventual champion Maryland in the second round.

== Roster ==
2001–02 Wisconsin Badgers men's basketball team
Players
Coaches

| Pos. | # | Name | Height | Weight | Year | Hometown |
|---|---|---|---|---|---|---|
| G | 2 | Travon Davis | 5 ft 10 in (1.78 m) | 180 lb (82 kg) | Sr | Argo, Illinois |
| G | 3 | Ike Ukawuba (W) | 6 ft 3 in (1.91 m) | 175 lb (79 kg) | So | Chicago |
| F | 10 | Michael Jackson (W) | 6 ft 6 in (1.98 m) | 205 lb (93 kg) | So | Milwaukee |
| G | 12 | Max Peek (W) | 6 ft 4 in (1.93 m) | 190 lb (86 kg) | Jr | Eagan, Minnesota |
| G | 13 | Clayton Hanson (W) | 6 ft 5 in (1.96 m) | 185 lb (84 kg) | Fr | Reedsburg, Wisconsin |
| G | 20 | Kirk Penney | 6 ft 5 in (1.96 m) | 227 lb (103 kg) | Jr | Auckland |
| F | 21 | Andreas Helmigk (injured) (redshirt) | 6 ft 9 in (2.06 m) | 230 lb (104 kg) | Fr | Klagenfurt |
| G | 24 | Freddie Owens | 6 ft 2 in (1.88 m) | 190 lb (86 kg) | So | Milwaukee |
| G/F | 25 | Neil Plank | 6 ft 5 in (1.96 m) | 200 lb (91 kg) | Fr | Mount Zion, Illinois |
| F/C | 30 | Dave Mader | 6 ft 11 in (2.11 m) | 240 lb (109 kg) | RS So | Appleton, Wisconsin |
| F | 32 | Deandre Buchanan (W) | 6 ft 5 in (1.96 m) | 190 lb (86 kg) | Fr | Verona, Wisconsin |
| G | 34 | Devin Harris | 6 ft 3 in (1.91 m) | 185 lb (84 kg) | Fr | Milwaukee |
| F | 40 | Charlie Wills | 6 ft 8 in (2.03 m) | 230 lb (104 kg) | RS Sr | Angola, Indiana |
| F | 52 | Brent Boettcher (W) | 6 ft 5 in (1.96 m) | 200 lb (91 kg) | Fr | Green Bay, Wisconsin |
| F | 54 | Mike Wilkinson | 6 ft 8 in (2.03 m) | 205 lb (93 kg) | RS Fr | Blue Mounds, Wisconsin |

Head coach

- Bo Ryan (Wilkes)

Assistant coach(es)

- Rob Jeter (UW-Platteville)
- Tony Bennett (UW-Green Bay)
- Greg Gard (UW-Platteville)

Legend

- (C) Team captain
- (S) Suspended
- (I) Ineligible
- (W) Walk-on
- Injured
- Current redshirt

Roster
Last update: 2014-1-12

== Schedule ==
| Date time, TV | Rank^{#} | Opponent^{#} | Result | Record | Site city, state |
Regular Season
| 11/17/2001* | | at UNLV | L 69–74 | 0–1 | Thomas & Mack Center; Las Vegas, Nevada |
| 11/23/2001* | | at Hawaii–Hilo; Big Island Basketball Invitational | W 78–62 | 1–1 | UH Hilo New Gymnasium; Hilo, HI |
| 11/24/2001* | | vs. Weber State; Big Island Basketball Invitational | L 69–73 | 1–2 | UH Hilo New Gymnasium; Hilo, HI |
| 11/25/2001* | | vs. Hawaii; Big Island Basketball Invitational | L 57–60 | 1–3 | UH Hilo New Gymnasium; Hilo, HI |
| 11/28/2001* | | at Georgia Tech; ACC–Big Ten Challenge | L 61–62 | 1–4 | McCamish Pavilion; Atlanta, Georgia |
| 12/01/2001* | | UW–Green Bay | W 70–57 | 2–4 | Kohl Center; Madison, Wisconsin |
| 12/03/2001* | | Temple | L 67–70 ^{2OT} | 2–5 | Kohl Center; Madison, Wisconsin |
| 12/08/2001* | | at Ohio | W 77–71 | 3–5 | Convocation Center; Athens, Ohio |
| 12/10/2001* | | at Xavier | L 48–57 | 3–6 | Cintas Center; Cincinnati |
| 12/15/2001* | | Furman | W 68–60 | 4–6 | Kohl Center; Madison, Wisconsin |
| 12/22/2001* | | No. 14 Marquette | W 86–73 | 5–6 | Kohl Center; Madison, Wisconsin |
| 12/27/2001* | | at UW–Milwaukee | W 81–79 | 6–6 | Klotsche Center; Milwaukee |
| 12/29/2001* | | Tennessee | W 65–62 | 7–6 | Kohl Center; Madison, Wisconsin |
| 1/01/2002 | | at No. 9 Iowa | L 57–69 | 7–7 (0–1) | Carver–Hawkeye Arena; Iowa City, IA |
| 1/05/2002 | | No. 7 Illinois | W 72–66 | 8–7 (1–1) | Kohl Center; Madison, Wisconsin |
| 1/09/2002 | | at Penn State | L 49–51 | 8–8 (1–2) | Bryce Jordan Center; University Park, Pennsylvania |
| 1/12/2002 | | at No. 25 Michigan State | W 64–63 | 9–8 (2–2) | Breslin Center; East Lansing, Michigan |
| 1/16/2002 | | Minnesota | W 73–64 | 10–8 (3–2) | Kohl Center; Madison, Wisconsin |
| 1/19/2002 | | Purdue | W 77–66 | 11–8 (4–2) | Kohl Center; Madison, Wisconsin |
| 1/23/2002 | | at No. 9 Illinois | L 48–80 | 11–9 (4–3) | Assembly Hall; Champaign, Illinois |
| 1/26/2002 | | Penn State | W 66–63 | 12–9 (5–3) | Kohl Center; Madison, Wisconsin |
| 1/30/2002 | | at Northwestern | L 60–69 | 12–10 (5–4) | Welsh-Ryan Arena; Evanston, Illinois |
| 2/02/2002 | | at Michigan | L 53–64 | 12–11 (5–5) | Crisler Arena; Ann Arbor, Michigan |
| 2/06/2002 | | No. 16 Ohio State | W 94–92 ^{OT} | 13–11 (6–5) | Kohl Center; Madison, Wisconsin |
| 2/09/2002 | | Northwestern | W 73–44 | 14–11 (7–5) | Kohl Center; Madison, Wisconsin |
| 2/13/2002 | | at No. 22 Indiana | W 64–63 | 15–11 (8–5) | Assembly Hall; Bloomington, Indiana |
| 2/16/2002 | | at Minnesota | W 67–62 | 16–11 (9–5) | Williams Arena; Minneapolis |
| 2/19/2002 | | Iowa | W 64–56 | 17–11 (10–5) | Kohl Center; Madison, Wisconsin |
| 2/27/2002 | | Michigan | W 74–54 | 18–11 (11–5) | Kohl Center; Madison, Wisconsin |
Big Ten tournament
| 3/08/2002 | | vs. Iowa; Big Ten tournament – Quarterfinals | L 56–58 | 18–12 | Conseco Fieldhouse; Indianapolis |
NCAA tournament
| 3/15/2002*; CBS | No. (8 seed) | vs. No. (9 seed) St. John's; First Round | W 80–70 | 19–12 | MCI Center; Washington, D.C. |
| 3/17/2002*; CBS | No. (8 seed) | vs. No. (1 seed) Maryland; Second Round | L 57–87 | 19–13 | MCI Center; Washington, D.C. |
*Non-conference game. ^{#}Rankings from AP Poll. (#) Tournament seedings in parentheses.
