= 2001–02 Michigan Wolverines men's basketball team =

American college basketball season

2001–02 Michigan Wolverines men's basketball
- Conference: Big Ten Conference
- Record: 11–18 (5–11 Big Ten)
- Head coach: Tommy Amaker (1st season)
- Assistant coaches: Charles Ramsey; Chuck Swenson; Billy Schmidt
- MVP: Chris Young
- Captains: Rotolu Adebiyi; Leon Jones; Chris Young

2001–02 Big Ten Conference men's basketball standings
	Conf.				Overall
Team	W		L	PCT	W		L	PCT
No. 13 Illinois	11	–	5	.688	26	–	9	.743
No. 23 Indiana	11	–	5	.688	25	–	12	.676
Wisconsin	11	–	5	.688	19	–	13	.594
Michigan State	10	–	6	.625	19	–	12	.613
Minnesota	9	–	7	.563	18	–	13	.581
Northwestern	7	–	9	.438	16	–	13	.552
Iowa	5	–	11	.313	19	–	16	.543
Purdue	5	–	11	.313	13	–	18	.419
Michigan	5	–	11	.313	11	–	18	.379
Penn State	3	–	13	.188	7	–	21	.250
No. 14 Ohio State*†	0	–	0	–	0	–	0	–
† 2002 Big Ten tournament winner Rankings from AP poll *Ohio State: 30 reg. season games; 2 NCAA Tourn. games vacated due to sanctions against the program Disputed record: Ohio State-(24-8)(11-5)

The 2001–02 Michigan Wolverines men's basketball team represented the University of Michigan in intercollegiate college basketball during the 2001–02 season. The team played its home games in the Crisler Arena in Ann Arbor, Michigan, and was a member of the Big Ten Conference. Under the direction of head coach Tommy Amaker, the team finished tied for eighth in the Big Ten Conference. The team earned a tenth seed and advanced to the quarterfinals of the 2002 Big Ten Conference men's basketball tournament. The team failed to earn an invitation to either the 2002 National Invitation Tournament or the 2002 NCAA Men's Division I Basketball Tournament. The team was unranked for all eighteen weeks of Associated Press Top Twenty-Five Poll, and it also ended the season unranked in the final USA Today/CNN Poll.

Rotolu Adebiyi, Leon Jones and Chris Young served as team co-captains, and Chris Young earned team MVP honors. The team's leading scorers were LaVell Blanchard (430 points), Bernard Robinson, Jr. (351 points) and Chris Young (330 points). The leading rebounders were Blanchard (184), Young (165) and Robinson (132).

The team established the school's single-season free throw percentage record of 75.4% (384–509), surpassing the 75.2% set in 1999. The record would last for six seasons. The team also set the school's current single-game free throw percentage record of 100% on 16-for-16 shooting against Ohio State on March 2, 2002, surpassing the 15-for-15 performances set on February 21, 1987, and tied on March 8, 1990.

In the 2002 Big Ten Conference men's basketball tournament at the Conseco Fieldhouse from March 7–10, Michigan was seeded tenth. In the first round they defeated number 7 Northwestern 72–51. Then they lost in the second round to number 2 Ohio State 75–68

== Team players drafted into the NBA ==
Year	Round	Pick	Overall	Player	NBA club
2004	2	15	45	Bernard Robinson	Charlotte Bobcats
