= 2002 Atlantic 10 men's basketball tournament =

- Classification: Division I
- Season: 2001–02
- Teams: 12
- Site: First Union Spectrum; Philadelphia, Pennsylvania
- Champions: Xavier (2nd title)
- Winning coach: Thad Matta (1st title)
- MVP: David West (Xavier)

2001–02 Atlantic 10 men's basketball standings
	Conf.				Overall
Team	W		L	PCT	W		L	PCT
East
Saint Joseph's	12	–	4	.750	19	–	12	.613
Temple	12	–	4	.750	19	–	15	.559
St. Bonaventure	8	–	8	.500	17	–	13	.567
UMass	6	–	10	.375	13	–	16	.448
Fordham	4	–	12	.250	8	–	20	.286
Rhode Island	4	–	12	.250	8	–	20	.286
West
No. 22 Xavier †	14	–	2	.875	26	–	6	.813
Richmond	11	–	5	.688	22	–	14	.611
Dayton	10	–	6	.625	21	–	11	.656
La Salle	6	–	10	.375	15	–	17	.469
George Washington	5	–	11	.313	12	–	16	.429
Duquesne	4	–	12	.250	9	–	19	.321
† 2002 Atlantic 10 Tournament winner Rankings from AP Poll

The 2002 Atlantic 10 men's basketball tournament was played from March 6 to March 9, 2002. The tournament was played at the First Union Spectrum in Philadelphia, Pennsylvania. The winner was named champion of the Atlantic 10 Conference and received an automatic bid to the 2002 NCAA Men's Division I Basketball Tournament. Xavier won the tournament and got the conference's only bid to the NCAA Tournament. Dayton, Richmond, Temple, Saint Joseph's and St. Bonaventure received bids to the 2002 National Invitation Tournament. David West of Xavier was named the tournament's Most Outstanding Player. Future NBA players Rasual Butler of La Salle and Romain Sato and Lionel Chalmers, both of Xavier, were among those joining West on the All-Championship Team.

== Format ==
The tournament was a single-elimination tournament. Seeding was determined by the regular season standings in each division. With the conference divided into East and West divisions, the top two teams in each division received a first-round bye. This was after a one-year departure from this format due to having only eleven teams in the conference the year before.

== Bracket ==
First round Wednesday, March 6
W4	La Salle	83
E5	Fordham	63
E3	St. Bonaventure	81
W6	Duquesne	66
E4	UMass	73
W5	George Washington	62
W3	Dayton	90
E6	Rhode Island	71

Quarterfinals; Thursday, March 7
E1	Temple	66
W4	La Salle	72
W2	Richmond	78
E3	St. Bonaventure	69
W1	#24 Xavier	65
E4	Massachusetts	59^{OT}
E2	Saint Joseph's	74
W3	Dayton	81

Semifinals; Friday, March 8
W4	La Salle	60
W2	Richmond	68
W1	#24 Xavier	66
W3	Dayton	59

Final; Saturday, March 9
W2	Richmond	60
W1	#24 Xavier	73

All games played at The Spectrum, Philadelphia, Pennsylvania
* - Overtime
