= 2001–02 Xavier Musketeers men's basketball team =

American college basketball season

2001–02 Xavier Musketeers men's basketball

Atlantic 10 Regular Season Champions Atlantic 10 tournament champions

NCAA tournament, second round
- Conference: Atlantic 10 Conference

Ranking
- Coaches: No. 24
- AP: No. 22
- Record: 26–6 (14–2 A10)
- Head coach: Thad Matta (1st season)
- Home arena: Cintas Center

2001–02 Atlantic 10 men's basketball standings
	Conf.				Overall
Team	W		L	PCT	W		L	PCT
East
Saint Joseph's	12	–	4	.750	19	–	12	.613
Temple	12	–	4	.750	19	–	15	.559
St. Bonaventure	8	–	8	.500	17	–	13	.567
UMass	6	–	10	.375	13	–	16	.448
Fordham	4	–	12	.250	8	–	20	.286
Rhode Island	4	–	12	.250	8	–	20	.286
West
No. 22 Xavier †	14	–	2	.875	26	–	6	.813
Richmond	11	–	5	.688	22	–	14	.611
Dayton	10	–	6	.625	21	–	11	.656
La Salle	6	–	10	.375	15	–	17	.469
George Washington	5	–	11	.313	12	–	16	.429
Duquesne	4	–	12	.250	9	–	19	.321
† 2002 Atlantic 10 Tournament winner Rankings from AP Poll

The 2001–02 Xavier Musketeers men's basketball team represented Xavier University from Cincinnati, Ohio in the 2001–02 season. Led by head coach Thad Matta, the Musketeers finished 22–5 (14–2 A10) in the regular season, and won the Atlantic 10 tournament. In the NCAA tournament, the Musketeers defeated Hawaii in the first round before losing to eventual Final Four participant Oklahoma.

== Roster ==
2001–02 Xavier Musketeers men's basketball team
Players
Coaches

Pos.	#	Name	Height	Weight	Year	Hometown
G	0	Lionel Chalmers	6 ft 0 in (1.83 m)	180 lb (82 kg)	So	Albany, New York
G	10	Romain Sato	6 ft 5 in (1.96 m)	205 lb (93 kg)	So
PF	30	David West	6 ft 9 in (2.06 m)	235 lb (107 kg)	Jr

Head coach

- Thad Matta (Butler)

Assistant coach(es)

Legend

- (C) Team captain
- (S) Suspended
- (I) Ineligible
- (W) Walk-on
- Injured
- Current redshirt

== Schedule and results ==
Date time, TV	Rank^{#}	Opponent^{#}	Result	Record	Site city, state
Regular season
Nov 17, 2001*		Coastal Carolina	W 72–41	1–0	Cintas Center; Cincinnati, Ohio
Nov 24, 2001*		at No. 5 Missouri	L 60–72	1–1	Hearnes Center; Columbia, Missouri
Nov 28, 2001*		at Miami (OH)	W 87–58	2–1	Millett Hall; Oxford, Ohio
Dec 1, 2001*		at San Francisco	W 87–72	3–1	War Memorial Gymnasium; San Francisco, California
Dec 5, 2001*		at Purdue	L 66–70	3–2	Mackey Arena; West Lafayette, Indiana
Dec 8, 2001*		Long Island University	W 108–57	4–2	Cintas Center; Cincinnati, Ohio
Dec 10, 2001*		Wisconsin	W 57–48	5–2	Cintas Center; Cincinnati, Ohio
Dec 14, 2001*		Cincinnati	L 55–75	5–3	Cintas Center; Cincinnati, Ohio
Dec 20, 2001*		Kent State	W 62–56	6–3	Cintas Center (10,250); Cincinnati, Ohio
Dec 22, 2001*		at Creighton	W 72–65	7–3	Omaha Civic Auditorium; Omaha, Nebraska
Dec 31, 2001*		Siena	W 68–59	8–3	Cintas Center; Cincinnati, Ohio
Jan 5, 2002		at Dayton	W 66–59	9–3 (1–0)	University of Dayton Arena; Dayton, Ohio
Jan 9, 2002		Fordham	W 88–58	10–3 (2–0)	Cintas Center; Cincinnati, Ohio
Jan 12, 2002		Richmond	W 72–62	11–3 (3–0)	Cintas Center; Cincinnati, Ohio
Jan 17, 2002		at George Washington	W 71–63	12–3 (4–0)	Charles E. Smith Center; Washington, D.C.
Jan 19, 2002		at La Salle	W 71–67	13–3 (5–0)	Tom Gola Arena; Philadelphia, Pennsylvania
Jan 23, 2002		at Rhode Island	W 67–49	14–3 (6–0)	Keaney Gymnasium; Kingston, Rhode Island
Jan 26, 2002		Dayton	W 75–59	15–3 (7–0)	Cintas Center; Cincinnati, Ohio
Jan 30, 2002		Duquesne	W 79–65	16–3 (8–0)	Cintas Center; Cincinnati, Ohio
Feb 2, 2002		at Richmond	W 67–64	17–3 (9–0)	Robins Center; Richmond, Virginia
Feb 9, 2002		at St. Bonaventure	L 79–80	17–4 (9–1)	Reilly Center; St. Bonaventure, New York
Mar 2, 2002		UMass	W 72–52	22–5 (14–2)	Cintas Center; Cincinnati, Ohio
Atlantic 10 Tournament
Mar 7, 2002*	No. 24	vs. UMass; Semifinals	W 65–59 ^{OT}	23–5	The Spectrum; Philadelphia, Pennsylvania
Mar 8, 2002*	No. 24	vs. Dayton; Semifinals	W 66–59	24–5	The Spectrum; Philadelphia, Pennsylvania
Mar 9, 2002*	No. 24	vs. Richmond; Championship Game	W 73–60	25–5	The Spectrum; Philadelphia, Pennsylvania
NCAA Tournament
Mar 15, 2002*	(7 W) No. 22	vs. (10 W) No. 25 Hawaii; Second Round	W 70–58	26–5	American Airlines Center; Dallas, Texas
Mar 17, 2002*; CBS	(7 W) No. 22	vs. (2 W) No. 3 Oklahoma; Second Round	L 65–78	26–6	American Airlines Center (19,951); Dallas, Texas
*Non-conference game. ^{#}Rankings from AP poll. (#) Tournament seedings in parentheses. W=West.
