= 2001–02 Indiana Hoosiers men's basketball team =

American college basketball season

2001–02 Indiana Hoosiers men's basketball

NCAA tournament, Runner-up Big Ten Regular Season Co-Champions

National Championship Game, L 52–64 vs. Maryland
- Conference: Big Ten Conference

Ranking
- Coaches: No. 3
- AP: No. 23
- Record: 25–12 (11–5 Big Ten)
- Head coach: Mike Davis (2nd season)
- Assistant coaches: John Treloar; Jim Thomas; Ben McDonald
- Home arena: Assembly Hall

2001–02 Big Ten Conference men's basketball standings
	Conf.				Overall
Team	W		L	PCT	W		L	PCT
No. 13 Illinois	11	–	5	.688	26	–	9	.743
No. 23 Indiana	11	–	5	.688	25	–	12	.676
Wisconsin	11	–	5	.688	19	–	13	.594
Michigan State	10	–	6	.625	19	–	12	.613
Minnesota	9	–	7	.563	18	–	13	.581
Northwestern	7	–	9	.438	16	–	13	.552
Iowa	5	–	11	.313	19	–	16	.543
Purdue	5	–	11	.313	13	–	18	.419
Michigan	5	–	11	.313	11	–	18	.379
Penn State	3	–	13	.188	7	–	21	.250
No. 14 Ohio State*†	0	–	0	–	0	–	0	–
† 2002 Big Ten tournament winner Rankings from AP poll *Ohio State: 30 reg. season games; 2 NCAA Tourn. games vacated due to sanctions against the program Disputed record: Ohio State-(24-8)(11-5)

The 2001–02 Indiana Hoosiers men's basketball team represented Indiana University. The head coach was Mike Davis, in his second season as head coach (5th overall). The team played its home games in the Assembly Hall in Bloomington, Indiana, and was a member of the Big Ten Conference.

The Hoosiers finished the regular season with a 19–10 record, and after losing in the second round of the Big Ten tournament, earned a 5-seed in the 2002 NCAA tournament. What followed was a surprise run to the National Championship game, earning the program its eighth Final Four appearance. Though the Hoosiers lost to Maryland in the final, they upset top-seeded Duke in the Sweet 16 and took down future Indiana head coach Kelvin Sampson's 2-seed Oklahoma Sooners squad in the Final Four.

The team was led by Bloomington-native sophomore star Jared Jeffries. Other members of the team included seniors Dane Fife and Jarrad Odle, as well as another former Indiana Mr. Basketball, Tom Coverdale.

As of 2025, this is the last time the Indiana Hoosiers have advanced to either the Final Four or the national championship game. This is also the only time in Hoosier history that the team lost the national title game.

== Roster ==
2001–02 Indiana Hoosiers men's basketball team
Players
Coaches

Pos.	#	Name	Height	Weight	Year	Hometown
F	1	Jared Jeffries	6 ft 11 in (2.11 m)	—	So	Bloomington, Indiana
G	2	A.J. Moye	6 ft 3 in (1.91 m)	—	So	Atlanta
G	3	Tom Coverdale	6 ft 2 in (1.88 m)	—	Jr	Noblesville, Indiana
F/C	5	George Leach	6 ft 11 in (2.11 m)	—	So	Charlotte, North Carolina
G	11	Dane Fife	6 ft 4 in (1.93 m)	—	Sr	Clarkston, Michigan
G	12	Donald Perry	6 ft 2 in (1.88 m)	—	Fr	Tallulah, Louisiana
G	21	Mark Johnson	6 ft 2 in (1.88 m)	—	Fr	Oregon, Wisconsin
G/F	32	Kyle Hornsby	6 ft 5 in (1.96 m)	—	Jr	Anacoco, Louisiana
G	34	Ryan Tapak	6 ft 2 in (1.88 m)	—	Fr	Indianapolis, Indiana
F	43	Jarrad Odle	6 ft 8 in (2.03 m)	—	Sr	Swayzee, Indiana
F	50	Jeff Newton	6 ft 9 in (2.06 m)	—	Jr	Atlanta

Head coach

- Mike Davis

Assistant coach(es)

Legend

- (C) Team captain
- (S) Suspended
- (I) Ineligible
- (W) Walk-on
- Injured
- Current redshirt

== Schedule/results ==
Date time, TV	Rank^{#}	Opponent^{#}	Result	Record	Site city, state
Regular season
11/18/2001*	No. 22	at Charlotte	W 65–61	1–0	Halton Arena; Charlotte, North Carolina
11/21/2001*	No. 20	vs. Alaska-Anchorage; Great Alaska Shootout, 1st Round	W 101–66	2–0	Sullivan Arena; Anchorage, Alaska
11/23/2001*	No. 20	vs. Marquette; Great Alaska Shootout, 2nd Round	L 49–50	2–1	Sullivan Arena; Anchorage, AK
11/24/2001*	No. 20	vs. Texas; Great Alaska Shootout, 3rd Place Game	W 77–71	3–1	Sullivan Arena; Anchorage, AK
11/28/2001*		at North Carolina; ACC – Big Ten Challenge	W 79–66	4–1	Dean Smith Center; Chapel Hill, North Carolina
12/1/2001*		at Southern Illinois	L 60–72	4–2	SIU Arena; Carbondale, Illinois
12/4/2001*		Notre Dame	W 76–75	5–2	Assembly Hall; Bloomington, Indiana
12/8/2001*		No. 15 Ball State	W 74–61	6–2	Assembly Hall; Bloomington, Indiana
12/15/2001*	No. 21	vs. Miami (FL); Orange Bowl Basketball Classic	L 53–58	6–3	National Car Rental Center; Sunrise, Florida
12/22/2001*		vs. No. 7 Kentucky; Indiana–Kentucky rivalry	L 52–66	6–4	RCA Dome; Indianapolis
12/28/2001*		vs. Eastern Washington; Hoosier Classic	W 87–60	7–4	Conseco Fieldhouse; Indianapolis
12/29/2001*		vs. No. 23 Butler; Hoosier Classic	L 64–66	7–5	Conseco Fieldhouse; Indianapolis
1/2/2002		at Northwestern	W 59–44	8–5 (1–0)	Welsh-Ryan Arena; Evanston, Illinois
1/5/2002		Penn State	W 61–54	9–5 (2–0)	Assembly Hall; Bloomington, Indiana
1/8/2002		No. 25 Michigan State	W 83–65	10–5 (3–0)	Assembly Hall; Bloomington, Indiana
1/13/2002		at No. 13 Iowa	W 77–66	11–5 (4–0)	Carver–Hawkeye Arena; Iowa City, Iowa
1/19/2002	No. 25	at Ohio State	L 67–73	11–6 (4–1)	Value City Arena; Columbus, Ohio
1/23/2002		at Penn State	W 85–51	12–6 (5–1)	Bryce Jordan Center; University Park, Pennsylvania
1/26/2002		No. 9 Illinois; Rivalry	W 88–57	13–6 (6–1)	Assembly Hall; Bloomington, Indiana
1/31/2002		Purdue; Indiana–Purdue rivalry	W 66–52	14–6 (7–1)	Assembly Hall; Bloomington, Indiana
2/2/2002		at Minnesota	L 74–88	14–7 (7–2)	Williams Arena; Minneapolis
2/5/2002		Iowa	W 79–51	15–7 (8–2)	Assembly Hall; Bloomington, Indiana
2/9/2002*		Louisville	W 77–62	16–7 (8–2)	Assembly Hall; Bloomington, Indiana
2/13/2002	No. 22	Wisconsin	L 63–64	16–8 (8–3)	Assembly Hall; Bloomington, Indiana
2/17/2002	No. 22	at Michigan	W 75–55	17–8 (9–3)	Crisler Center; Ann Arbor, Michigan
2/20/2002	No. 23	No. 19 Ohio State	W 63–57	18–8 (10–3)	Assembly Hall; Bloomington, Indiana
2/24/2002	No. 23	at Michigan State	L 54–57	18–9 (10–4)	Breslin Center; East Lansing, Michigan
2/26/2002	No. 25	at No. 15 Illinois; Rivalry	L 62–70	18–10 (10–5)	Assembly Hall; Champaign, Illinois
3/2/2002	No. 25	Northwestern	W 79–67	19–10 (11–5)	Assembly Hall; Bloomington, Indiana
Big Ten tournament
3/8/2002	No. 23	vs. Michigan State; First Round	W 67–56	20–10	Conseco Fieldhouse; Indianapolis
3/9/2002	No. 23	vs. Iowa; Second Round	L 60–62	20–11	Conseco Fieldhouse; Indianapolis
NCAA tournament
3/14/2002*	(5 S) No. 23	vs. (12 S) Utah; First Round	W 75–56	21–11	ARCO Arena; Sacramento, California
3/16/2002*	(5 S) No. 23	vs. (13 S) UNC Wilmington; Second Round	W 76–67	22–11	ARCO Arena; Sacramento, California
3/21/2002*	(5 S) No. 23	vs. (1 S) No. 1 Duke; Sweet Sixteen	W 74–73	23–11	Rupp Arena; Lexington, Kentucky
3/23/2002*	(5 S) No. 23	vs. (10 S) Kent State; Elite Eight	W 81–69	24–11	Rupp Arena; Lexington, Kentucky
3/30/2002*	(5 S) No. 23	vs. (2 W) No. 4 Oklahoma; Final Four	W 73–64	25–11	Georgia Dome; Atlanta
4/1/2002*	(5 S) No. 23	vs. (1 E) No. 2 Maryland; National Championship	L 52–64	25–12	Georgia Dome; Atlanta, Georgia
*Non-conference game. ^{#}Rankings from AP poll. (#) Tournament seedings in parentheses. S=South.

== Players drafted into the NBA ==
Round	Pick	Player	NBA club
1	11	Jared Jeffries	Washington Wizards
