= 2001–02 Ohio State Buckeyes men's basketball team =

American college basketball season

2001–02 Ohio State Buckeyes men's basketball

Big Ten tournament champion (vacated) Big Ten Regular season co-champion (vacated)

NCAA tournament, second round (vacated)
- Conference: Big Ten

Ranking
- Coaches: No. 17
- AP: No. 14
- Record: 0-0 (24–8 unadjusted) (11–5 Big Ten)
- Head coach: Jim O'Brien (5th season)
- Home arena: Value City Arena

2001–02 Big Ten Conference men's basketball standings
	Conf.				Overall
Team	W		L	PCT	W		L	PCT
No. 13 Illinois	11	–	5	.688	26	–	9	.743
No. 23 Indiana	11	–	5	.688	25	–	12	.676
Wisconsin	11	–	5	.688	19	–	13	.594
Michigan State	10	–	6	.625	19	–	12	.613
Minnesota	9	–	7	.563	18	–	13	.581
Northwestern	7	–	9	.438	16	–	13	.552
Iowa	5	–	11	.313	19	–	16	.543
Purdue	5	–	11	.313	13	–	18	.419
Michigan	5	–	11	.313	11	–	18	.379
Penn State	3	–	13	.188	7	–	21	.250
No. 14 Ohio State*†	0	–	0	–	0	–	0	–
† 2002 Big Ten tournament winner Rankings from AP poll *Ohio State: 30 reg. season games; 2 NCAA Tourn. games vacated due to sanctions against the program Disputed record: Ohio State-(24-8)(11-5)

The 2001–02 Ohio State Buckeyes men's basketball finished in a four-way tie atop the Big Ten regular season standings, and followed that by winning the Big Ten tournament for the first time. The Buckeyes received an automatic bid to the NCAA tournament as No. 4 seed in the West region. After an opening round victory over No. 13 seed Davidson, they lost to No. 12 seed Missouri in the second round. The Buckeyes finished with a record of 24–8 (11–5 Big Ten), but all 32 games – including the Big Ten regular season and tournament titles, and NCAA Tournament appearance – were later vacated due to NCAA sanctions as a result of the Jim O’Brien scandal.

== Roster ==
2001–02 Ohio State Buckeyes men's basketball team
Players
Coaches

Pos.	#	Name	Height	Weight	Year	Hometown
G	13	Brian Brown	6 ft 4 in (1.93 m)	200 lb (91 kg)	Sr	Brooklyn, New York
G	21	Boban Savović	6 ft 5 in (1.96 m)	240 lb (109 kg)	Sr

Head coach

- Jim O'Brien

Assistant coach(es)

Legend

- (C) Team captain
- (S) Suspended
- (I) Ineligible
- (W) Walk-on
- Injured
- Current redshirt

== Schedule and results ==
Date time, TV	Rank^{#}	Opponent^{#}	Result	Record	Site city, state
Regular season
Nov 18, 2001*		Winthrop	W 78–54	1–0	Value City Arena; Columbus, Ohio
Nov 20, 2001*		Albany	W 87–62	2–0	Value City Arena; Columbus, Ohio
Nov 27, 2001*		NC State	W 64–50	3–0	Value City Arena; Columbus, Ohio
Dec 2, 2001*		UNC Wilmington	W 80–54	4–0	Value City Arena; Columbus, Ohio
Dec 9, 2001*		IUPUI	W 83–70	5–0	Value City Arena; Columbus, Ohio
Dec 12, 2001*		Santa Clara	W 88–41	6–0	Value City Arena; Columbus, Ohio
Dec 15, 2001*		at Louisville	L 61–66	6–1	Freedom Hall; Louisville, Kentucky
Dec 19, 2001*		Pittsburgh	L 55–62	6–2	Value City Arena; Columbus, Ohio
Dec 22, 2001*		Eastern Illinois	W 72–59	7–2	Value City Arena; Columbus, Ohio
Dec 29, 2001*		UNC Greensboro	W 85–54	8–2	Value City Arena; Columbus, Ohio
Big Ten tournament
Mar 8, 2002*	No. 21	vs. Michigan; Quarterfinals	W 75–68	21–7	Conseco Fieldhouse; Indianapolis, Indiana
Mar 9, 2002*	No. 21	vs. No. 10 Illinois; Semifinals	W 94–88	22–7	Conseco Fieldhouse; Indianapolis, Indiana
Mar 10, 2002*	No. 21	vs. Iowa; Championship game	W 81–64	23–7	Conseco Fieldhouse; Indianapolis, Indiana
NCAA Tournament
Mar 14, 2002*	(4 W) No. 14	vs. Davidson; First Round	W 69–64	24–7	University Arena; Albuquerque, New Mexico
Mar 16, 2002*	(4 W) No. 14	vs. (12 W) Missouri; Second Round	L 67–83	24–8	University Arena; Albuquerque, New Mexico
*Non-conference game. ^{#}Rankings from AP poll. (#) Tournament seedings in parentheses.
