= 2001–02 Illinois Fighting Illini men's basketball team =

American college basketball season

2001–02 Illinois Fighting Illini men's basketball

Big Ten Regular Season co-champions Las Vegas Invitational, Champion

NCAA tournament, Sweet Sixteen
- Conference: Big Ten Conference

Ranking
- Coaches: No. 11
- AP: No. 13
- Record: 26–9 (11–5 Big Ten)
- Head coach: Bill Self (2nd season)
- Assistant coaches: Billy Gillispie (2nd season); Wayne McClain (1st season); Norm Roberts (2nd season)
- MVP: Frank Williams
- Captains: Cory Bradford; Frank Williams
- Home arena: Assembly Hall

2001–02 Big Ten Conference men's basketball standings
	Conf.				Overall
Team	W		L	PCT	W		L	PCT
No. 13 Illinois	11	–	5	.688	26	–	9	.743
No. 23 Indiana	11	–	5	.688	25	–	12	.676
Wisconsin	11	–	5	.688	19	–	13	.594
Michigan State	10	–	6	.625	19	–	12	.613
Minnesota	9	–	7	.563	18	–	13	.581
Northwestern	7	–	9	.438	16	–	13	.552
Iowa	5	–	11	.313	19	–	16	.543
Purdue	5	–	11	.313	13	–	18	.419
Michigan	5	–	11	.313	11	–	18	.379
Penn State	3	–	13	.188	7	–	21	.250
No. 14 Ohio State*†	0	–	0	–	0	–	0	–
† 2002 Big Ten tournament winner Rankings from AP poll *Ohio State: 30 reg. season games; 2 NCAA Tourn. games vacated due to sanctions against the program Disputed record: Ohio State-(24-8)(11-5)

The 2001–02 Illinois Fighting Illini men's basketball team represented the University of Illinois.

== Regular season ==
In 2002, the Illini earned a four-way share of the Big Ten title before advancing to the Sweet Sixteen of the NCAA tournament. Frank Williams again earned first-team All-Big Ten honors as the five seniors who finished their careers took the Illini from an 11th-place finish in the league in 1999 to consecutive Big Ten titles in 2001 and 2002.

=== Roster ===
2001–02 Illinois Fighting Illini men's basketball team
Players
Coaches

Pos.	#	Name	Height	Weight	Year	Previous school	Hometown
G	00	Brett Melton	6 ft 5 in (1.96 m)	195 lb (88 kg)	So	Mahomet-Seymour High School	Mahomet, Illinois
G	4	Luther Head	6 ft 3 in (1.91 m)	175 lb (79 kg)	Fr	Manley High School	Chicago, Illinois
G	13	Cory Bradford (C)	6 ft 3 in (1.91 m)	200 lb (91 kg)	RS Sr	Raleigh Egypt High School	Memphis, Tennessee
F/C	21	Robert Archibald	6 ft 11 in (2.11 m)	250 lb (113 kg)	Sr	Lafayette High School	Ballwin, Missouri
F	22	Lucas Johnson	6 ft 8 in (2.03 m)	230 lb (104 kg)	Sr	Maine West High School	Des Plaines, Illinois
F	23	Blandon Ferguson	6 ft 3 in (1.91 m)	205 lb (93 kg)	Jr	St. Joseph Notre Dame High School	Oakland, California
G	24	Sean Harrington	6 ft 3 in (1.91 m)	185 lb (84 kg)	Jr	Elgin High School	Bartlett, Illinois
G	25	Jerrance Howard	6 ft 1 in (1.85 m)	200 lb (91 kg)	RS So	Peoria High School	Peoria, Illinois
G	30	Frank Williams (C)	6 ft 3 in (1.91 m)	212 lb (96 kg)	RS Jr	Manual High School	Peoria, Illinois
G	31	Nick Huge (redshirt)	6 ft 4 in (1.93 m)	215 lb (98 kg)	Jr	Christian High School/Appalachian State University	Charlotte, North Carolina
F	33	Damir Krupalija	6 ft 9 in (2.06 m)	231 lb (105 kg)	Sr	Rockford Boylan High School	Rockford, Illinois
F	34	Brian Cook	6 ft 10 in (2.08 m)	240 lb (109 kg)	Jr	Lincoln Community High School	Lincoln, Illinois
F	42	Clayton Thomas (W)	6 ft 7 in (2.01 m)	240 lb (109 kg)	Sr	Larkin High School	Elgin, Illinois
F	43	Roger Powell	6 ft 6 in (1.98 m)	220 lb (100 kg)	Fr	Joliet Central High School	Joliet, Illinois
C	45	Nick Smith	7 ft 2 in (2.18 m)	240 lb (109 kg)	RS Fr	Bloomingdale High School	Valrico, Florida

Head coach

- Bill Self (Oklahoma State) (2nd year)

Assistant coach(es)

- Billy Gillispie (Southwest Texas State) (2nd year)
- Norm Roberts (Queens College) (2nd year)
- Wayne McClain (Illinois State) (1st year)

Legend

- (C) Team captain
- (S) Suspended
- (I) Ineligible
- (W) Walk-on
- Injured
- Current redshirt

Roster
Last update: 2014-11-12

== Schedule ==
Date time, TV	Rank^{#}	Opponent^{#}	Result	Record	Site (attendance) city, state
Exhibition
Nov 7, 2001*; 7:00 pm		Illinois All-Stars	W 104-81		Assembly Hall; Champaign, IL
Nov 12, 2001*; 7:00 pm		Lincoln U-Missouri	W 111-60		Assembly Hall; Champaign, IL
Non-Conference regular season
11/16/2001*	No. 3	Gonzaga	W 76–58	1–0	Assembly Hall (16,500); Champaign, IL
11/19/2001*	No. 2	Eastern Illinois; Las Vegas Invitational (1st Round)	W 93–53	2–0	Assembly Hall (13,827); Champaign, Illinois
11/22/2001*	No. 2	vs. Penn; Las Vegas Invitational	W 78–71	3–0	Valley High School (1,700); Las Vegas, Nevada
11/23/2001*	No. 2	vs. Georgia Tech; Las Vegas Invitational	W 105–66	4–0	Valley High School (2,000); Las Vegas, Nevada
11/24/2001*	No. 2	vs. Southern Illinois; Las Vegas Invitational, (Championship)	W 75–72	5–0	Valley High School (2,500); Las Vegas, Nevada
11/27/2001*	No. 2	at No. 5 Maryland; Big Ten-ACC Challenge	L 63–76	5–1	Cole Field House (14,500); College Park, Maryland
12/1/2001*	No. 2	Texas A&M–Corpus Christi	W 80–56	6–1	Assembly Hall (16,500); Champaign, Illinois
12/6/2000*	No. 5	vs. No. 7 Arizona	L 82–87	6–2	US Airways Center (10,697); Phoenix, Arizona
12/8/2001*	No. 5	vs. Arkansas	W 94–91	7–2	United Center (18,671); Chicago, Illinois
12/16/2001*	No. 10	Western Illinois	W 98–62	8–2	Assembly Hall (14,653); Champaign, Illinois
12/18/2001*	No. 9	Illinois State	W 87–73	9–2	Assembly Hall (16,500); Champaign, Illinois
12/22/2001*	No. 9	vs. No. 8 Missouri; Braggin' Rights	W 72–61	10–2	Scottrade Center (22,153); St. Louis, Missouri
12/29/2001*	No. 7	Loyola (Chicago)	W 87–72	11–2	Assembly Hall (16,500); Champaign, Illinois
Big Ten regular season
1/2/2002	No. 7	Minnesota	W 76–53	12–2 (1–0)	Assembly Hall (16,500); Champaign, Illinois
1/5/2002	No. 7	at Wisconsin	L 66–72	12–3 (1–1)	Kohl Center (17,142); Madison, Wisconsin
1/9/2002	No. 9	at Purdue	L 74–84	12–4 (1–2)	Mackey Arena (12,876); West Lafayette, Indiana
1/12/2002	No. 9	Michigan	W 94–70	13–4 (2–2)	Assembly Hall (16,500); Champaign, Illinois
1/15/2002	No. 11	No. 17 Iowa; Rivalry	W 77–66	14–4 (3–2)	Assembly Hall (16,500); Champaign, Illinois
1/23/2002	No. 9	Wisconsin	W 80–48	15–4 (4–2)	Assembly Hall (16,500); Champaign, Illinois
1/26/2002; CBS	No. 9	at Indiana; Rivalry	L 57–88	15–5 (4–3)	Assembly Hall (17,456); Bloomington, Indiana
1/29/2002	No. 12	at No. 25 Ohio State	L 67–78	15–6 (4–4)	Value City Arena (19,200); Columbus, Ohio
2/3/2002; CBS	No. 12	Michigan State	L 61–67	15–7 (4–5)	Assembly Hall (16,500); Champaign, Illinois
2/7/2002	No. 21	at Michigan	W 68–60	16–7 (5–5)	Crisler Arena (10,710); Ann Arbor, Michigan
2/9/2002	No. 21	Purdue	W 69–67	17–7 (6–5)	Assembly Hall (16,500); Champaign, Illinois
2/12/2002	No. 18	at Michigan State	W 63–61	18–7 (7–5)	Breslin Student Events Center (14,759); East Lansing, Michigan
2/16/2002*; CBS	No. 18	at Seton Hall	W 75–65	19–7	Continental Airlines Arena (10,070); South Orange, New Jersey
2/20/2002	No. 16	Penn State	W 83–56	20–7 (8–5)	Assembly Hall (16,500); Champaign, Illinois
2/23/2002	No. 16	at Northwestern; Rivalry	W 56–41	21–7 (9–5)	Welsh-Ryan Arena (8,117); Evanston, Illinois
2/26/2002	No. 15	No. 25 Indiana; Rivalry	W 70–62	22–7 (10–5)	Assembly Hall (16,500); Champaign, Illinois
3/3/2002; CBS	No. 15	at Minnesota	W 67–66	23–7 (11–5)	Williams Arena (14,612); Minneapolis, Minnesota
Big Ten tournament
3/8/2002	(3) No. 10	vs. (6) Minnesota; Quarterfinals	W 92–76	24–7	Conseco Fieldhouse (18,996); Indianapolis, Indiana
3/9/2002; CBS	(3) No. 10	vs. (2) No. 21 Ohio State; Semifinals	L 88–94	24–8	Conseco Fieldhouse (18,996); Indianapolis, Indiana
NCAA tournament
3/15/2002; CBS	(4 MW) No. 13	vs. (13 MW) San Diego State; First Round	W 93–64	25–8	United Center (20,850); Chicago, Illinois
3/17/2002; CBS	(4 MW) No. 13	vs. (12 MW) Creighton; Second Round	W 72–60	26–8	United Center (21,525); Chicago, Illinois
3/22/2002; CBS	(4 MW) No. 13	vs. (1 MW) No. 2 Kansas; Sweet Sixteen	L 69–73	26–9	Kohl Center (16,310); Madison, Wisconsin
*Non-conference game. ^{#}Rankings from AP Poll. (#) Tournament seedings in parentheses. All times are in Central Time.

== Season Statistics ==
Legend
GP	Games played	GS	Games started	Avg	Average per game
FG	Field-goals made	FGA	Field-goal attempts	Off	Offensive rebounds
Def	Defensive rebounds	A	Assists	TO	Turnovers
Blk	Blocks	Stl	Steals	High	Team high

Final Individual Statistics
			Minutes		Scoring		Total FGs			3-point FGs			Free-Throws			Rebounds							
Player	GP	GS	Tot	Avg	Pts	Avg	FG	FGA	Pct	3FG	3FA	Pct	FT	FTA	Pct	Off	Def	Tot	Avg	A	TO	Blk	Stl
Williams, Frank	35	34	1135	32.4	566	16.2	174	443	.393	54	159	.340	164	203	.808	32	131	163	4.7	153	96	10	71
Cook, Brian	35	34	1008	28.8	471	13.5	174	342	.509	27	74	.365	96	110	.873	64	169	233	6.7	44	77	50	29
Bradford, Cory	35	35	1133	32.4	406	11.6	133	312	.426	74	189	.392	66	86	.767	32	78	110	3.1	87	68	5	29
Archibald, Robert	34	31	769	22.6	362	10.6	114	173	.659	0	1	.000	134	205	.654	70	118	188	5.5	44	67	38	25
Harrington, Sean	35	14	868	24.8	223	6.4	73	178	.410	56	141	.397	21	29	.724	7	53	60	1.7	87	39	0	28
Head, Luther	35	13	581	16.6	156	4.5	63	124	.508	16	55	.291	14	25	.560	17	50	67	1.9	59	43	5	34
Krupalija, Damir	21	1	332	15.8	146	7.0	49	84	.583	11	23	.478	37	50	.740	37	62	99	4.7	29	23	5	7
Smith, Nick	33	4	334	10.1	127	3.8	49	91	.538	0	3	.000	29	44	.659	26	48	74	2.2	20	28	19	5
Powell, Roger	27	0	160	5.9	79	2.9	27	50	.540	3	5	.600	22	36	.611	19	29	48	1.8	2	10	4	3
Ferguson, Blandon	30	7	232	7.7	67	2.2	23	60	.383	0	3	.000	21	28	.750	18	28	46	1.5	18	26	1	10
Johnson, Lucas	17	2	304	17.9	64	3.8	15	38	.395	7	24	.292	27	37	.730	14	29	43	2.5	30	18	3	13
Howard, Jerrance	21	0	81	3.9	20	1.0	7	18	.389	2	7	.286	4	4	1.000	6	7	13	0.6	14	11	0	4
Melton, Brett	7	0	45	6.4	17	2.4	5	11	.455	4	8	.500	3	5	.600	0	3	3	0.4	2	1	0	0
Thomas, Clayton	8	0	13	1.6	2	0.3	1	5	.200	0	0	.000	0	0	.000	1	3	4	0.5	0	2	1	0
Young, Walter	2	0	5	2.5	2	1.0	1	3	.333	0	0	.000	0	0	.000	0	1	1	0.5	1	0	0	0
Team																49	63	112			3		
Total	35		7000		2708	77.4	908	1932	.470	254	692	.367	638	862	.740	392	872	1264	36.1	590	512	141	258
Opponents	35		7000		2369	67.7	815	1960	.416	235	691	.340	504	760	.663	405	711	1116	31.9	449	540	101	195

== NCAA basketball tournament ==
- Midwest regional
  - Illinois 93, San Diego State 64
  - Illinois 72, Creighton 60
- Regional semifinal
  - Kansas 73, Illinois 69

== Awards and honors ==
- Frank Williams
  - Associated Press All-American honorable mention
  - Team Most Valuable Player
  - Fighting Illini All-Century team (2005)
- Brian Cook
  - Fighting Illini All-Century team (2005)

== Team players drafted into the NBA ==
Player	NBA Club	Round	Pick
Frank Williams	Denver Nuggets	1	25
Robert Archibald	Memphis Grizzies	2	31
