= Luke Recker =

American basketball player

Personal information
- Born: June 17, 1978 (age 48) Lima, Ohio, U.S.
- Listed height: 6 ft 6 in (1.98 m)
- Listed weight: 215 lb (98 kg)

Career information
- High school: DeKalb (Waterloo, Indiana)
- College: Indiana (1997–1999); Iowa (2000–2002)
- NBA draft: 2002: undrafted
- Playing career: 2002–2009
- Position: Shooting guard / small forward
- Number: 4, 9, 24

Career history
- 2002–2003: Asheville Altitude
- 2003–2004: Euro Roseto
- 2004–2005: CB Girona
- 2005–2006: Basket Livorno
- 2006–2009: Bilbao Berri

Career highlights
- AP Honorable Mention All-American (2002); Third-team All-Big Ten (2002); McDonald's All-American (1997); Second-team Parade All-American (1997); Indiana Mr. Basketball (1997)

Lucas Andrew Recker (born June 17, 1978) is an American former professional basketball player. A swingman who primarily played the shooting guard position but could also play small forward, he was one of the top high school prospects of the class of 1997. He played his first two years of college basketball at Indiana before deciding to transfer. After missing one year due to a car accident, he went on to play two more years for Iowa. He went undrafted in the 2002 NBA draft and after a season in the NBA Development League he played professional basketball in Italy and Spain. Luke has two children named Avery (June 20, 2007) and Bennett (December 26th, 2010) Luke is married to Megan Recker.

== High school career ==
Recker was born in Lima, Ohio to father Clair Recker and mother Marti Pepple; he then moved to Indiana in his mother's hometown of Auburn, Indiana and attended DeKalb High School in Waterloo, Indiana. He was already recruited by colleges in his early high school career, and at age 15, in his sophomore year in high school, he committed to play for Indiana, citing his desire to play for coach Bob Knight.

During his junior year of high school he averaged 21 points, 4 rebounds and 6 assists with a field goal percentage of 59%. He was one of the top ranked guards in the nation by his senior year, during which he averaged 26.8 points, 6.8 rebounds and 5 assists, and for his career he recorded totals of 2,008 points and 477 assists, both school records at DeKalb.

Recker's remarkable performance in his senior year earned him the Indiana Mr. Basketball award as the best high school basketball player in the state of Indiana in the year 1997; Gatorade also named him as their Indiana Player of the Year. He was selected as a Second Team Parade All-American and as a McDonald's All-American. In the 1997 McDonald's All-American Boys Game he scored 10 points, going 3/12 from the field and 3/4 from the free throw line.

== College career ==
=== Indiana ===
Recker officially signed to play for Indiana in May 1997 after having verbally committed in his sophomore year of high school. He chose to wear jersey number 4. Despite being only a freshman, Recker was given a starting role from Knight, and in his first year he led the team in steals with an average of 1.5 per game and was the second player for minutes played (939) and points per game. He scored a then career-high 29 points against Oklahoma during the 1998 NCAA tournament. He ended the season having started 30 of his 32 games, with averages of 12.8 points, 3.9 rebounds, 2.8 assists and 1.5 steals, shooting almost 50% from the field. During his freshman year he mainly played the small forward position and was named an All-Big Ten Honorable Mention.

As a sophomore he was already considered one of the top perimeter players of Indiana's roster, and further increased his scoring average, recording double figures in 26 of the 34 games played (in 12 games he scored 20 points or more). He was the best scorer of the team with an average of 16.1 points per game. He started 33 of his 34 games, and played a total of 1,080 minutes (31.8 per game). His successful sophomore season earned him a place in the All-Big Ten Third Team, and he was also an Academic All-American. During his two years at Indiana he scored 954 points.

Despite his success at Indiana, in April 1999 he announced his desire to transfer to another program, stating he was not "satisfied with his development as a player". He restricted his choices to Arizona, North Carolina, Florida, Iowa and Notre Dame, and finally decided to transfer to Arizona. Due to NCAA transfer rules, he was to sit out the 1999–2000 season. He chose the jersey number 2 and attended the University of Arizona for the Fall semester.

Recker and several other people were involved in a car accident on July 10, 1999, near Durango, Colorado. Recker was a passenger with his girlfriend Kelly Craig (aged 19) and her brother, Jason Craig (17), in a Ford Taurus driven by their friend John Hollberg (23). While they were on County Road 240 heading to Durango for a carnival, a truck driven by Bob Hardwick invaded the central lane and collided with two other vehicles at 70 mph. A total of 15 people were involved in the accident. John Hollberg died while Recker, Kelly and Jasper Craig suffered severe injuries that required surgery. Recker's injuries included a laceration to his left ear, cuts on his head and damage to his left wrist and thumb.

=== Iowa ===
After the accident, Recker began treatment to recover from his injuries, and changed his college choice, deciding to transfer to Iowa instead of Arizona. Among the factors that contributed to this decision was Recker's intention to stay closer both to his father (who lived in Washington, Iowa) and his girlfriend Kelly Craig, who was in Chicago, Illinois still recovering from the accident. In January 2000 he came back to training in Iowa City, Iowa under coach Steve Alford. Originally ineligible until January 2001, he sat out only his first semester at Iowa because the NCAA granted him a waiver to come back to play one semester earlier due to his involvement in the accident, which was considered a case of "special circumstances" after Recker appealed to the NCAA trying to regain his eligibility.

At Iowa he chose to wear number 24, which was also his high school jersey number. He was immediately given a prominent role within the program, and he became a starter: after starting the first 18 games of the season, he fractured his kneecap and had to miss the remaining 15 games. In the games he played in his junior season he played 33.6 minutes per game, averaging 18.1 points (a career high), 3.9 rebounds, 2.7 assists and 1.1 steals, while shooting 43% from three-point range (another career high). Despite his brief appearance in the season he still earned several honors (All-Big Ten Honorable Mention, All-Big Ten Academic Team, NABC All-District Second Team).

In his senior season Recker was again playing a key role at Iowa, receiving starting assignments and was the top scorer of the team, with an average of 17.1 points: he also was the steals leader with 56 (1.6 average), ranked second in assists (88 total, 2.5 average) and third in rebounding (119 total, 3.4 average). He scored a personal career high 31 points against Missouri and was named in the All-Tournament team in the 2002 Big Ten tournament: during the competition Recker scored two game-winning shots in a row, one against Wisconsin and one against his former team Indiana. Iowa ultimately lost in the title game against Ohio State. At the end of the season, Recker was named Iowa's team MVP along with Reggie Evans, and also set a new record for free throw percentage in a season with 88.5%. In his two years at Iowa he scored a total of 926 points.

At the end of his senior season he was named an AP Honorable Mention. In his four years of college basketball he scored a total of 1,880 points with an average of 15.8.

=== College statistics ===
Year	Team	GP	GS	MPG	FG%	3P%	FT%	RPG	APG	SPG	BPG	PPG
1997–98	Indiana	32	30	29.3	.498	.362	.781	3.9	2.8	1.5	0.4	12.8
1998–99	Indiana	34	33	31.8	.428	.364	.747	4.0	2.6	1.7	0.3	16.1
1999–2000	Iowa	Did not play – transfer										
2000–01	Iowa	18	18	33.6	.439	.431	.856	3.9	2.7	1.1	0.1	18.1
2001–02	Iowa	35	32	33.3	.444	.413	.885	3.4	2.5	1.6	0.4	17.1
Career		119	113	32.0	.450	.394	.811	3.8	2.6	1.5	0.3	15.8

== Professional career ==
At the 2002 NBA Pre Draft camp held in Chicago he was measured at 6 ft 4¾ without shoes, 6 ft 6½ with shoes, with a 6 ft 7 in wingspan and an 8 ft 5 in standing reach, and weighted 198 lbs. Despite being projected as a second-round pick, or even a late first-rounder, Recker went undrafted at the 2002 NBA draft.

He joined the Miami Heat for the 2002 Summer League and played 9 games, starting 7: he averaged 10.0 points and 2.6 rebounds in 16.2 minutes of play. He then signed for the Heat as a free agent on August 13, 2002, but was waived on October 28, 2002.

After being cut from the Heat roster, in December 2002 Recker joined the Asheville Altitude, a team that played in the NBA Development League. In 34 games Recker averaged 8.9 points, 1.7 rebounds, 0.9 assists and 0.5 steals in 18.7 minutes per game: he was mainly used as a reserve, and started only 4 games.

In 2003 he participated to the Reebok Pro Summer League, playing for the Boston Celtics. He did not make the Celtics roster for the NBA season and signed for Euro Roseto, an Italian team based in Roseto which played in the Lega Basket Serie A, the Italian top level. He played 33 games, starting 32, and averaged 17.2 points, 2.8 rebounds, 1.6 assists and 2.1 steals in 31.5 minutes per game. He was very efficient, shooting 60.3% from the field (40.9% from 3 averaging 7.7 shots a game) and 84.8% from the free throw line. He had a career-high 35 points against Skipper Bologna: he shot 11 from 20 from 3-point range, one of the all-time highs of the Italian basketball league.

After leaving Roseto at the end of the season, Recker joined the Indiana Pacers in the 2004 Salt Lake City NBA Summer League, playing 5 games (3 starts) and averaging 9.6 points, 2.4 rebounds, 1.4 assists and 0.8 steals in 19.8 minutes per game. Again he did not make the final roster, and signed for Spanish club CB Girona. In the Liga ACB he played 19 games, starting 15, and scored 15.2 points per game, 2.8 rebounds and 0.7 assists.

In 2005 he returned to Italy, this time signing for Basket Livorno. He started all of the 34 games he played in the 2005–06 Serie A season, averaging 14.3 points, 3.0 rebounds, 0.8 assists and 2.0 steals in 29.8 minutes per game, with a season high of 20 points. In 2006 he joined Bilbao Berri, where in his first year he started all 33 games he averaged 14.4 points, 2.4 rebounds and 0.5 assists in 28.1 minutes per game. He played two more seasons in Bilbao: in 2007–08, as a starter he averaged 11.2 points, 2.5 rebounds and 1.0 assist per game, while in 2008–09 he became one of the first options off the bench (9 starts in 32 games played), and his averages were 7.8 points, 1.9 rebounds and 0.8 assists. After the end of the season, Recker retired from professional basketball.
