= 2001–02 Michigan State Spartans men's basketball team =

American college basketball season

2001–02 Michigan State Spartans men's basketball

Coca-Cola Spartan Classic champion

NCAA tournament, first round
- Conference: Big Ten Conference
- Record: 19–12 (10–6 Big Ten)
- Head coach: Tom Izzo (7th season)
- Associate head coach: Brian Gregory (3rd season)
- Assistant coaches: Mike Garland (6th season); Mark Montgomery (1st season)
- Captains: Aloysius Anagonye; Adam Ballinger; Marcus Taylor
- Home arena: Breslin Center

2001–02 Big Ten Conference men's basketball standings
	Conf.				Overall
Team	W		L	PCT	W		L	PCT
No. 13 Illinois	11	–	5	.688	26	–	9	.743
No. 23 Indiana	11	–	5	.688	25	–	12	.676
Wisconsin	11	–	5	.688	19	–	13	.594
Michigan State	10	–	6	.625	19	–	12	.613
Minnesota	9	–	7	.563	18	–	13	.581
Northwestern	7	–	9	.438	16	–	13	.552
Iowa	5	–	11	.313	19	–	16	.543
Purdue	5	–	11	.313	13	–	18	.419
Michigan	5	–	11	.313	11	–	18	.379
Penn State	3	–	13	.188	7	–	21	.250
No. 14 Ohio State*†	0	–	0	–	0	–	0	–
† 2002 Big Ten tournament winner Rankings from AP poll *Ohio State: 30 reg. season games; 2 NCAA Tourn. games vacated due to sanctions against the program Disputed record: Ohio State-(24-8)(11-5)

The 2001–02 Michigan State Spartans men's basketball team represented Michigan State University in the 2001–02 NCAA Division I men's basketball season. They were coached by Tom Izzo in his seventh season. The Spartans played their home games at Breslin Center in East Lansing, Michigan and were members of the Big Ten Conference. MSU finished the regular season 19–12, 10–6 to finish in a tie for fourth place in the Big Ten. The Spartans received a bid to the NCAA tournament for the fifth consecutive year where they lost in the First Round to NC State.

== Previous season ==
The Spartans finished the 2000–01 season 28–5, 13–3 in Big Ten play to finish in second place. Michigan State received a No. 1 seed in the NCAA tournament, their fourth straight trip to the Tournament, and advanced the Final Four, their third straight trip under Tom Izzo.

The Spartans lost Charlie Bell (13.5 PPG, 4.7 RPG, 5.1 APG) to graduation and freshman Zach Randolph (10.8 PPG, 6.7 RPG, 1.0 APG) and sophomore Jason Richardson (14.7 PPG, 5.9 RPG, 2.2 APG) to the NBA draft following the season.

== Season summary ==
After three consecutive years of trips to the Final Four, the Spartans began the season ranked No. 15 in the AP Poll. Michigan State was led by sophomore Marcus Taylor (16.8 points and 5.3 assists per game), freshman Chris Hill (11.5 points per game), and junior Adam Ballinger (11.2 points and 6.8 rebounds per game). The Spartans participated in the Preseason NIT where they defeated Detroit Mercy and No. 24 Oklahoma at Breslin Center, but then fell to No. 18 Syracuse and No. 23 Fresno State at Madison Square Garden. The Spartans also suffered non-conference losses to No. 6 Florida and No. 16 Stanford, but did beat No. 6 Arizona in a rematch of their Final Four clash the previous Spring. MSU finished the non-conference season at 9–4 and ranked No. 19 in the country.

In Big Ten play, MSU started the season with three straight losses, the last to Wisconsin, which snapped MSU's 53-game home winning streak. The Spartans did defeat No. 12 Illinois, No. 18 Ohio State at home and on the road, and No. 23 Indiana. Michigan State finished the conference schedule at 10–6 and in fourth place with an overall record of 19–10. The Spartans slipped out of the ranking following their opening conference losses and remained unranked the remainder of the season. MSU lost in the quarterfinals of the Big Ten tournament to No. 23 Indiana marking the first time since 1997 that Michigan State did not win either the Big Ten regular season or tournament title.

The Spartans received an at-large bid as a No. 10 seed in the NCAA Tournament, their fifth consecutive trip. The Spartans were eliminated in the First Round by NC State.

Following the season, sophomore Marcus Taylor declared for the NBA draft.

== Roster ==
2001–02 Michigan State Spartans men's basketball team
Name	Class	Pos	Height	Summary
Aaron Alexander	SO			0.3 Pts, 0.3 Reb, 0.0 Ast
Aloysius Anagonye	SO	F	6'8"	7.7 Pts, 6.3 Reb, 1.5 Ast
Alan Anderson	FR	F	6'6"	6.5 Pts, 4.2 Reb, 1.6 Ast
Jason Andreas	SO	C	6'10"	2.6 Pts, 2.9 Reb, 0.5 Ast
Adam Ballinger	JR	F	6'9"	11.2 Pts, 6.8 Reb, 1.1 Ast
Tim Bograkos	FR	G	6'2"	1.4 Pts, 1.9 Reb, 0.5 Ast
Chris Hill	FR	G	6'3"	11.5 Pts, 3.2 Reb, 2.1 Ast
Mat Ishbia	SR	G	5'10"	1.1 Pts, 0.2 Reb, 0.7 Ast
Marcus Taylor	SO	G	6'3"	16.8 Pts, 2.9 Reb, 5.3 Ast
Kelvin Torbert	FR	G	6'4"	8.2 Pts, 3.4 Reb, 1.5 Ast
Brian Westrick	JR	F	6'5"	0.8 Pts, 0.5 Reb, 0.0 Ast
Adam Wolfe	FR	F	6'9"	1.7 Pts, 1.7 Reb, 0.1 Ast

== Schedule and results ==
Date time, TV	Rank^{#}	Opponent^{#}	Result	Record	Site city, state
Exhibition
Nov 2, 2001*		Magic Johnson All-Stars	W 89–87		Breslin Center; East Lansing, MI
Nov 18, 2001*		Midwest All-Stars	W 72–62 ^{OT}		Breslin Center; East Lansing, MI
Non-conference regular season
Nov 12, 2001*; ESPN2	No. 15	Detroit; Preseason NIT	W 80–70	1–0	Breslin Center; East Lansing, MI
Nov 14, 2001*	No. 15	No. 24 Oklahoma; Preseason NIT	W 67–55	2–0	Breslin Center; East Lansing, MI
Nov 21, 2001*	No. 13	vs. No. 18 Syracuse; Preseason NIT semifinals	L 58–69	2–1	Madison Square Garden; New York, NY
Nov 23, 2001*	No. 13	vs. No. 21 Fresno State; Preseason NIT third place game	L 58–63	2–2	Madison Square Garden; New York, NY
Nov 28, 2001*	No. 22	vs. No. 9 Virginia; Canceled because of wet floor and unplayable conditions ACC–Big Ten Challenge			Richmond Coliseum; Richmond, VA
Nov 30, 2001*	No. 22	IPFW; Coca Cola Spartan Classic	W 81–68	3–2	Breslin Center; East Lansing, MI
Dec 1, 2001*	No. 22	Lamar; Coca Cola Spartan Classic championship	W 80–71	4–2	Breslin Center; East Lansing, MI
Dec 5, 2001*	No. 24	at No. 4 Florida	L 70–74	4–3	O'Connell Center; Gainesville, FL
Dec 9, 2001*	No. 24	Nicholls State	W 92–38	5–3	Breslin Center; East Lansing, MI
Dec 15, 2001*; CBS	No. 23	No. 6 Arizona	W 74–60	6–3	Breslin Center; East Lansing, MI
Dec 17, 2001*	No. 17	UNC Asheville	W 76-56	7–3	Breslin Center; East Lansing, MI
Dec 19, 2001*	No. 17	Oakland	W 78–50	8–3	Breslin Center; East Lansing
Dec 22, 2001*	No. 17	Seton Hall	W 68–64	9–3	Breslin Center; East Lansing, MI
Dec 29, 2001*	No. 13	vs. No. 16 Stanford; Pete Newell Challenge	L 64–75	9–4	The Arena in Oakland; Oakland, CA
Big Ten regular season
Jan 5, 2002	No. 19	at Minnesota	L 67–70	9–5 (0–1)	Williams Arena; Minneapolis, MN
Jan 8, 2002	No. 25	at Indiana	L 65–83	9–6 (0–2)	Assembly Hall; Bloomington, IN
Jan 12, 2002	No. 25	Wisconsin	L 63–64	9-7 (0–3)	Breslin Center; East Lansing, MI
Jan 16, 2002		Purdue	W 65–56	10–7 (1–3)	Breslin Center; East Lansing, MI
Jan 19, 2002		at Penn State	W 77–65	11–7 (2–3)	Bryce Jordan Center; State College, PA
Jan 22, 2002		at Iowa	L 71–75	11–8 (2–4)	Carver-Hawkeye Arena; Iowa City, IA
Jan 30, 2002		Michigan; Rivalry	W 71–44	12–8 (3–4)	Breslin Center; East Lansing, MI
Feb 3, 2002; CBS		at No. 12 Illinois	W 67–61	13–8 (4–4)	Assembly Hall; Champaign, IL
Feb 6, 2002		at Northwestern	L 49–61	13–9 (4–5)	Welsh-Ryan Arena; Evanston, IL
Feb 10, 2002; CBS		Ohio State	W 67–64	14–9 (5–5)	Breslin Center; East Lansing, MI
Feb 12, 2002		Illinois	L 61–63	14–10 (5–6)	Breslin Center; East Lansing, MI
Feb 16, 2002		at Purdue	W 62–59	15–10 (6–6)	Mackey Arena; West Lafayette, IN
Feb 21, 200		Minnesota	W 74–55	16–10 (7–6)	Breslin Center; East Lansing, MI
Feb 24, 2002; CBS		No. 23 Indiana	W 57–54	17–10 (8–6)	Breslin Center; East Lansing, MI
Feb 26, 2002		at No. 18 Ohio State	W 81–76	18–10 (9–6)	Value City Arena; Columbus, OH
Mar 2, 2002		Iowa	W 93–79	19–10 (10–6)	Breslin Center; East Lansing, MI
Big Ten tournament
Mar 8, 2002; ESPN2	(5)	vs. (4) Indiana quarterfinals	L 56–67	19–11 (10–6)	Conseco Fieldhouse; Indianapolis, IN
NCAA tournament
Mar 15, 2002*; CBS	(10 E)	vs. (7 E) NC State; First Round	L 58–69	19–12	MCI Center; Washington, DC
*Non-conference game. ^{#}Rankings from Coaches' Poll. (#) Tournament seedings in parentheses. All times are in Eastern Time.

== Rankings ==
Ranking movement Legend: ██ Increase in ranking. ██ Decrease in ranking. (RV) Received votes but unranked. (NR) Not ranked.
Poll	Pre	Wk 2	Wk 3	Wk 4	Wk 5	Wk 6	Wk 7	Wk 8	Wk 9	Wk 10	Wk 11	Wk 12	Wk 13	Wk 14	Wk 15	Wk 16	Wk 17	Wk 18	Wk 19	Final
AP	15	13	22	24	23	17	13	19	25	NR	NR	NR	NR	NR	NR	NR	NR	NR	NR	NR

== Awards and honors ==
- Marcus Taylor – All-Big Ten First Team
- Marcus Taylor – USBWA All-District Team
- Adam Ballinger – All-Big Ten Third Team (Media)
