= 2001–02 Iowa Hawkeyes men's basketball team =

American college basketball season

2001–02 Iowa Hawkeyes men's basketball

Gazette Hawkeye Challenge champion

National Invitation Tournament, First Round
- Conference: Big Ten Conference
- Record: 19–16 (5–11 Big Ten)
- Head coach: Steve Alford (3rd season)
- Assistant coaches: Brian Jones; Greg Lansing
- MVPs: Reggie Evans; Luke Recker
- Home arena: Carver–Hawkeye Arena

2001–02 Big Ten Conference men's basketball standings
	Conf.				Overall
Team	W		L	PCT	W		L	PCT
No. 13 Illinois	11	–	5	.688	26	–	9	.743
No. 23 Indiana	11	–	5	.688	25	–	12	.676
Wisconsin	11	–	5	.688	19	–	13	.594
Michigan State	10	–	6	.625	19	–	12	.613
Minnesota	9	–	7	.563	18	–	13	.581
Northwestern	7	–	9	.438	16	–	13	.552
Iowa	5	–	11	.313	19	–	16	.543
Purdue	5	–	11	.313	13	–	18	.419
Michigan	5	–	11	.313	11	–	18	.379
Penn State	3	–	13	.188	7	–	21	.250
No. 14 Ohio State*†	0	–	0	–	0	–	0	–
† 2002 Big Ten tournament winner Rankings from AP poll *Ohio State: 30 reg. season games; 2 NCAA Tourn. games vacated due to sanctions against the program Disputed record: Ohio State-(24-8)(11-5)

The 2001–02 Iowa Hawkeyes men's basketball team represented the University of Iowa as members of the Big Ten Conference during the 2001–02 NCAA Division I men's basketball season. The team was led by third-year head coach Steve Alford and played their home games at Carver–Hawkeye Arena. After starting the season ranked in the AP Top 10, they finished 19-16 overall and 5–11 in Big Ten play.

== Roster ==
2001–02 Iowa Hawkeyes men's basketball team
Players
Coaches

Pos.	#	Name	Height	Weight	Year	Hometown
G	2	Ryan Hogan	6 ft 4 in (1.93 m)	—	Sr	Deerfield, Illinois
F	4	Glen Worley	6 ft 7 in (2.01 m)	—	So	Coralville, Iowa
C	5	Jared Reiner	6 ft 11 in (2.11 m)	—	So	Tripp, South Dakota
G	11	Brody Boyd	5 ft 11 in (1.8 m)	—	So	Dugger, Indiana
F	23	Duez Henderson	6 ft 7 in (2.01 m)	—	Sr	Detroit, Michigan
G	24	Luke Recker	6 ft 6 in (1.98 m)	205 lb (93 kg)	Sr	Auburn, Indiana
F	25	Rod Thompson	6 ft 6 in (1.98 m)	—	So	Galesburg, Illinois
G	30	Kyle Galloway	6 ft 6 in (1.98 m)	—	RS Sr	Sioux City, Iowa
F	32	Reggie Evans	6 ft 8 in (2.03 m)	—	Sr	Pensacola, Florida
G	43	Jason Smith	6 ft 3 in (1.91 m)	—	Sr
F	52	Cortney Scott	6 ft 6 in (1.98 m)	—	So	Jackson, Michigan
C	53	Sean Sonderleiter	6 ft 9 in (2.06 m)	—	So	Des Moines, Iowa

Head coach

- Steve Alford (Indiana)

Assistant coach(es)

- Brian Jones (Northern Iowa)
- Greg Lansing (South Dakota)
- Sam Alford

Legend

- (C) Team captain
- (S) Suspended
- (I) Ineligible
- (W) Walk-on
- Injured
- Current redshirt

== Schedule/Results ==
Date time, TV	Rank^{#}	Opponent^{#}	Result	Record	Site city, state
Non-conference regular season
Nov 13, 2001*	No. 9	Maryland-Eastern Shore	W 89–59	1–0	Carver-Hawkeye Arena; Iowa City, Iowa
Nov 14, 2001*	No. 9	Boston University	W 90–61	2–0	Carver-Hawkeye Arena; Iowa City, Iowa
Nov 17, 2001*	No. 9	Louisiana Tech	W 75–67	3–0	Carver-Hawkeye Arena; Iowa City, Iowa
11/20/2001*	No. 9	vs. No. 12 Memphis	W 75–71	4–0	Kemper Arena; Kansas City, MO
11/21/2001*	No. 9	vs. No. 5 Missouri	L 77–78	4–1	Kemper Arena; Kansas City, MO
11/27/2001*	No. 7	vs. No. 1 Duke	L 62–80	4–2	United Center; Chicago, IL
11/30/2001*	No. 12	Alabama State; Gazette Hawkeye Challenge	W 73–64	5–2	Carver-Hawkeye Arena; Iowa City, IA
12/1/2001*	No. 12	SMU; Gazette Hawkeye Challenge	W 86-69	6-2	Carver-Hawkeye Arena; Iowa City, IA
12/4/2001*	No. 12	at Northern Iowa; Iowa Big Four	L 76-78	6-3	UNI-Dome; Cedar Falls, IA
12/8/2001*	No. 12	at Iowa State; Rivalry	W 78-53	7-3	Hilton Coliseum; Ames, IA
12/12/2001*	No. 15	Drake; Iowa Big Four	W 101-59	8-3	Carver-Hawkeye Arena; Iowa City, IA
12/15/2001*	No. 15	at No. 2 Missouri; Fire Code Game	W 83-65	9-3	Hearnes Center; Columbia, MO
12/22/2001*	No. 12	Kansas State	W 89-70	10-3	Carver-Hawkeye Arena; Iowa City, IA
12/28/2001*	No. 9	Mercer	W 77-43	11-3	Carver-Hawkeye Arena; Iowa City, IA
Big Ten Regular Season
1/2/2002	No. 9	Wisconsin	W 69-57	12-3 (1-0)	Carver-Hawkeye Arena; Iowa City, IA
Big Ten tournament
3/7/2002		vs. Purdue; First round	W 87-72	17-14 (5-11)	Conseco Fieldhouse; Indianapolis, IN
3/8/2002		vs. Wisconsin; Quarterfinals	W 58-56	18-14 (5-11)	Conseco Fieldhouse; Indianapolis, IN
3/9/2002; CBS		vs. No. 23 Indiana; Semifinals	W 62-60	19-14 (5-11)	Conseco Fieldhouse; Indianapolis, IN
3/10/2002; CBS		vs. No. 21 Ohio State; Championship Game	L 64-81	19-15 (5-11)	Conseco Fieldhouse; Indianapolis, IN
National Invitation Tournament
3/13/2002*		LSU	L 61–63	19–16	Carver-Hawkeye Arena; Iowa City, IA
*Non-conference game. ^{#}Rankings from AP Poll. (#) Tournament seedings in parentheses.
