= 2001–02 NCAA Division I men's basketball rankings =

- Season: 2001–02
- NCAA Tournament: 2002
- Preseason No. 1: Duke
- NCAA Tournament Champions: Maryland
NCAA Division I men's basketball rankings


The 2001–02 NCAA Division I men's basketball rankings was made up of two human polls, the AP Poll and the Coaches Poll, in addition to various other preseason polls.

== Legend ==
	Increase in ranking
	Decrease in ranking
	New to rankings from previous week
Italics	Number of first place votes
(#–#)	Win–loss record
т	Tied with team above or below also with this symbol

== AP Poll ==
	Preseason Pre	Week 2 Nov. 19	Week 3 Nov. 26	Week 4 Dec. 4	Week 5 Dec. 11	Week 6 Dec. 18	Week 7 Dec. 25	Week 8 Jan. 1	Week 9 Jan. 8	Week 10 Jan. 15	Week 11 Jan. 22	Week 12 Jan. 29	Week 13 Feb. 5	Week 14 Feb. 12	Week 15 Feb. 19	Week 16 Feb. 26	Week 17 Mar. 5	Final Mar. 12	
1.	Duke	Duke (1–0)	Duke (4–0)	Duke (6–0)	Duke (8–0)	Duke (9–0)	Duke (10–0)	Duke (11–0)	Kansas (12–1)	Duke (14–1)	Duke (16–1)	Duke (18–1)	Duke (20–1)	Duke (22–1)	Kansas (23–2)	Kansas (25–2)	Kansas (27–2)	Duke (29–3)	1.
2.	Maryland	Illinois (1–0)	Illinois (5–0)	Missouri (7–0)	Missouri (9–0)	Maryland (8–1)	Kansas (9–1)	Kansas (10–1)	Duke (12–1)	Florida (14–1)	Kansas (15–2)	Kansas (17–2)	Kansas (19–2)	Kansas (21–2)	Maryland (21–3)	Maryland (23–3)	Maryland (25–3)	Kansas (29–3)	2.
3.	Illinois	UCLA (0–0)	Missouri (5–0)	Maryland (5–1)	Maryland (7–1)	Kansas (8–1)	Florida (9–1)	Florida (11–1)	Florida (12–1)	Maryland (13–2)	Maryland (14–3)	Maryland (16–3)	Maryland (18–3)	Maryland (19–3)	Duke (23–2)	Duke (25–2)	Duke (26–3)	Oklahoma (27–4)	3.
4.	Kentucky	Kansas (0–0)	Arizona (3–0)	Kansas (4–1)	Kansas (6–1)	Florida (7–1)	Virginia (8–0)	Virginia (9–0)	Maryland (11–2)	Kansas (13–2)	Cincinnati (17–1)	Cincinnati (19–1)	Oklahoma (17–3)	Oklahoma (19–3)	Cincinnati (24–2)	Cincinnati (26–2)	Oklahoma (24–4)	Maryland (26–4)	4.
5.	UCLA	Missouri (2–0)	Maryland (3–1)	Illinois (6–1)	Florida (6–1)	Virginia (5–0)	Oklahoma State (12–0)	Oklahoma State (13–0)	Oklahoma (11–1)	Oklahoma (13–1)	Florida (15–2)	Florida (15–3)	Alabama (19–3)	Cincinnati (22–2)	Alabama (22–4)	Oklahoma (22–4)	Cincinnati (27–3)	Cincinnati (30–3)	5.
6.	Florida	Maryland (2–1)	Florida (2–1)	Florida (4–1)	Arizona (5–1)	Oklahoma State (9–0)	Kentucky (7–2)	Kentucky (8–2)	Oklahoma State (13–1)	Oklahoma State (15–1)	Oklahoma (14–2)	Oklahoma (15–3)	Cincinnati (20–2)	Florida (18–4)	Oklahoma (20–4)	Alabama (23–5)	Gonzaga (28–3)	Gonzaga (29–3)	6.
7.	Kansas	Florida (2–1)	Iowa (4–1)	Arizona (3–1)	Virginia (5–0)	Kentucky (6–1)	Illinois (10–2)	Illinois (11–2)	Virginia (9–1)	Cincinnati (15–1)	Virginia (12–2)	Alabama (17–3)	Kentucky (15–5)	Alabama (20–4)	Gonzaga (24–3)	Gonzaga (26–3)	Pittsburgh (25–4)	Arizona (22–9)	7.
8.	Missouri	Arizona (3–0)	Kansas (2–1)	Virginia (4–0)	Oklahoma State (9–0)	Missouri (9–1)	Maryland (8–2)	Maryland (10–2)	Kentucky (9–3)	Syracuse (15–2)	Kentucky (12–4)	Virginia (14–3)	Florida (16–4)	Gonzaga (22–3)	Florida (19–5)	Florida (20–6)	Alabama (24–6)	Alabama (26–7)	8.
9.	Iowa	Iowa (3–0)	Virginia (3–0)	Syracuse (8–0)	Kentucky (5–1)	Illinois (8–2)	Iowa (10–3)	Iowa (11–3)	Illinois (12–3)	UCLA (12–3)	Illinois (14–4)	Oklahoma State (17–3)	Gonzaga (20–3)	Arizona (17–6)	Marquette (22–3)	Marquette (23–4)	Oregon (22–7)	Pittsburgh (27–5)	9.
10.	Saint Joseph's	Kentucky (1–1)	UCLA (2–1)	Oklahoma State (8–0)	Illinois (7–2)	Boston College (9–0)	Missouri (9–2)	Oklahoma (10–1)	Cincinnati (13–1)	Virginia (10–2)	Arizona (13–4)	Kentucky (13–5)	Virginia (14–5)	Kentucky (16–6)	Stanford (17–6)	Pittsburgh (23–4)	Illinois (23–7)	Connecticut (24–6)	10.
11.	Virginia	Virginia (2–0)	Stanford (3–0)	Kentucky (3–1)	Boston College (7–0)	Arizona (5–2)	Boston College (11–1)	Boston College (11–1)	UCLA (11–2)	Illinois (13–4)	Oklahoma State (15–3)	Gonzaga (18–3)	Arizona (15–6)	Marquette (21–3)	Pittsburgh (22–4)	Kentucky (19–7)	Florida (21–7)	Oregon (23–8)	11.
12.	Memphis	Memphis (3–0)	Syracuse (5–0)	Iowa (6–2)	Stanford (3–1)	Iowa (9–3)	Oklahoma (9–1)	Stanford (7–2)	Syracuse (13–2)	Kentucky (10–4)	Syracuse (16–3)	Illinois (15–5)	Miami (FL) (19–3)	Stanford (15–6)	Kentucky (17–7)	Oklahoma State (22–6)	Kentucky (20–8)	Marquette (26–6)	12.
13.	Stanford	Michigan State (2–0)	Kentucky (2–1)	Boston College (5–0)	Syracuse (9–1)	Stanford (4–1)	Michigan State (9–3)	Cincinnati (12–1)	Iowa (12–4)	Gonzaga (15–2)	UCLA (13–4)	UCLA (14–5)	Oregon (17–5)	Miami (FL) (20–4)	Oklahoma State (20–6)	Oregon (20–7)	Marquette (24–5)	Illinois (24–8)	13.
14.	Georgetown	Stanford (1–0)	Oklahoma State (6–0)	Stanford (3–1)	Marquette (9–0)	Marquette (9–0)	Arizona (6–3)	UCLA (9–2)	Alabama (13–2) т	Wake Forest (13–3)	Alabama (16–3)	Syracuse (17–4)	Oklahoma State (17–5)	Pittsburgh (21–4)	Arizona (17–8)	Arizona (18–8)	Oklahoma State (23–7)	Ohio State (23–7)	14.
15.	Michigan State	Oklahoma State (2–0)	Boston College (3–0)	Ball State (4–1)	Iowa (7–3)	Saint Joseph's (6–1)	UCLA (7–2)	Arizona (8–3)	Stanford (8–3) т	Arizona (11–4)	Georgia (15–3)	Miami (FL) (18–2)	UCLA (15–6)	Virginia (15–6)	Oregon (18–7)	Illinois (21–7)	Arizona (19–9)	Florida (22–8)	15.
16.	Temple	Georgetown (1–0)	Ball State (2–1)	Alabama (5–1)	Saint Joseph's (5–1)	Georgetown (8–1)	Stanford (6–2)	Syracuse (11–2)	Boston College (12–2)	Alabama (14–3)	Gonzaga (16–3)	Georgia (16–4)	Ohio State (17–3)	Oklahoma State (18–6)	Illinois (19–7)	Georgia (20–7)	Stanford (19–8)	Kentucky (20–9)	16.
17.	Boston College	Boston College (1–0)	Western Kentucky (4–0)	Marquette (7–0)	UCLA (4–2)	Michigan State (6–3)	Cincinnati (11–1)	Missouri (9–3)	Missouri (11–3)	Iowa (13–5)	Stanford (11–4)	Connecticut (14–3)	Georgia (17–5)	Oregon (17–7)	Miami (FL) (21–5)	Stanford (17–8)	Georgia (21–8)	Mississippi State (26–7)	17.
18.	Oklahoma State	Syracuse (3–0)	Georgetown (3–1)	Saint Joseph's (4–1)	Georgetown (6–1)	Syracuse (9–2)	Syracuse (10–2)	Alabama (10–2)	Gonzaga (12–2)	USC (13–2)	Missouri (14–4)	Stanford (12–5)	Marquette (19–3)	Illinois (17–7)	Georgia (19–7)	Ohio State (19–6)	Western Kentucky (26–3)	USC (22–9)	18.
19.	North Carolina	Saint Joseph's (1–1)	Saint Joseph's (2–1)	Georgetown (5–1)	Wake Forest (6–2)	UCLA (5–2)	Marquette (10–1)	Michigan State (9–4)	Wake Forest (11–3)	Stanford (9–4)	Oregon (14–4)	Arizona (13–6)	Wake Forest (16–6)	Wake Forest (16–7)	Ohio State (18–5)	USC (19–7)	Connecticut (21–6)	Western Kentucky (28–3)	19.
20.	USC	Indiana (1–0)	Memphis (4–2)	UCLA (2–2)	Ball State (5–2)	Wake Forest (7–2)	Georgetown (9–2)	Butler (13–0)	Arizona (9–4)	Georgia (14–2)	Ohio State (14–2)	Texas Tech (15–3)	Stanford (13–6)	UCLA (17–5)	USC (18–6)	Western Kentucky (25–3)	Miami (FL) (23–6)	Oklahoma State (23–8)	20.
21.	Syracuse	Western Kentucky (2–0)	Alabama (3–1)	Fresno State (6–1)	Indiana (6–2)	Ball State (6–2)	Alabama (9–2)	Miami (FL) (13–0)	Miami (FL) (14–1)	Missouri (12–4)	Wake Forest (13–5)	Pittsburgh (18–3)	Illinois (15–7)	Georgia (18–6)	Wake Forest (18–8)	California (20–5)	Ohio State (20–7)	Miami (FL) (24–7)	21.
22.	Indiana	Alabama (2–0)	Michigan State (2–2)	Memphis (6–2)	Alabama (6–2)	Oklahoma (7–1)	Gonzaga (10–2)	Gonzaga (11–2)	Mississippi State (14–1)	Boston College (13–3)	Miami (FL) (17–2)	Missouri (15–5)	Missouri (16–6)	Indiana (16–7)	Virginia (16–7)	Miami (FL) (21–6)	USC (20–8)	Xavier (25–5)	22.
23.	Texas	Fresno State (2–0)	Marquette (5–0)	Wake Forest (5–1)	Michigan State (5–3)	Alabama (7–2)	Butler (11–0)	Wake Forest (9–3)	Pittsburgh (14–1)	Oregon (12–4)	USC (14–3)	USC (15–4)	Syracuse (17–6)	Ohio State (17–5)	Indiana (17–8)	Connecticut (19–6)	Indiana (19–10)	Georgia (21–9)	23.
24.	Alabama	USC (1–1)	Fresno State (3–1)	Michigan State (4–2)	Oklahoma (5–1)	Gonzaga (9–2)	Miami (FL) (11–0)	Georgetown (9–3)	Butler (13–1)	Miami (FL) (15–2)	Texas (13–4)	Wake Forest (14–6)	Texas Tech (16–4)	NC State (18–6)	Western Kentucky (23–3)	Wake Forest (18–10)	Xavier (22–5)	Stanford (19–9)	24.
25.	Oklahoma	Temple (0–2)	Wake Forest (4–1)	Western Kentucky (4–2)	Gonzaga (7–2)	Cincinnati (7–1)	Wake Forest (8–3)	Marquette (11–2)	Michigan State (9–5)	Indiana (11–5)	Connecticut (12–3)	Ohio State (15–3)	USC (16–5)	USC (16–6)	UCLA (17–8)	Indiana (18–9)	California (21–7)	Hawaii (27–5)	25.
	Preseason Pre	Week 2 Nov. 19	Week 3 Nov. 26	Week 4 Dec. 4	Week 5 Dec. 11	Week 6 Dec. 18	Week 7 Dec. 25	Week 8 Jan. 1	Week 9 Jan. 8	Week 10 Jan. 15	Week 11 Jan. 22	Week 12 Jan. 29	Week 13 Feb. 5	Week 14 Feb. 12	Week 15 Feb. 19	Week 16 Feb. 26	Week 17 Mar. 5	Final Mar. 12	
		Dropped: Texas (0–1); Oklahoma (1–1)	Dropped: Indiana (3–1); USC (1–1); Temple (0–2)	None	Dropped: Fresno State (7–2); Memphis (7–3); Western Kentucky (6–2)	Dropped: Indiana (6–3)	Dropped: Saint Joseph's (6–3); Ball State (7–3)	None	Dropped: Georgetown (10–4); Marquette (12–3)	Dropped: Mississippi State; Pittsburgh; Butler (15–2); Michigan State (10–6)	Dropped: Iowa (13–7); Indiana (12–6)	Dropped: Oregon (15–5); Texas (14–5)	Dropped: Connecticut (14–5); Pittsburgh (19–4)	Dropped: Missouri (16–8); Syracuse (18–7); Texas Tech (16–6)	Dropped: NC State (18–8)	Dropped: Virginia (17–8); UCLA (18–9)	Dropped: Wake Forest (19–11)	Dropped: Indiana (20–11); California (21–8)	

== Coaches Poll ==
	Preseason	Week 1 Nov. 13	Week 2 Nov. 20	Week 3 Nov. 27	Week 4 Dec. 4	Week 5 Dec. 11	Week 6 Dec. 18	Week 7 Dec. 25	Week 8 Jan. 1	Week 9 Jan. 8	Week 10 Jan. 15	Week 11 Jan. 22	Week 12 Jan. 29	Week 13 Feb. 5	Week 14 Feb. 12	Week 15 Feb. 19	Week 16 Feb. 26	Week 17 Mar. 5	Week 18 Mar. 12	Final Apr. 1	
1.	Duke	Duke (0–0)	Duke (1–0)	Duke (4–0)	Duke (6–0)	Duke (8–0)	Duke (9–0)	Duke (10–0)	Duke (11–0)	Duke (12–1)	Duke (14–1)	Duke (16–1)	Duke (18–1)	Duke (20–1)	Duke (22–1)	Kansas (23–2)	Kansas (25–2)	Kansas (27–2)	Duke (29–3)	Maryland (32–4)	1.
2.	Illinois	Illinois (0–0)	Illinois (1–0)	Illinois (5–0)	Maryland (5–1)	Maryland (7–1)	Maryland (8–1)	Florida (9–1)	Florida (11–1)	Florida (12–1)	Florida (14–1)	Kansas (15–2)	Kansas (17–2)	Kansas (19–2)	Kansas (21–2)	Maryland (21–3)	Maryland (23–3)	Maryland (25–3)	Kansas (29–3)	Kansas (33–4)	2.
3.	Maryland	Kentucky (0–0)	Kansas (0–0)	Arizona (3–0)	Missouri (7–0)	Missouri (9–0)	Florida (7–1)	Kansas (9–1)	Kansas (10–1)	Kansas (12–1)	Maryland (13–2)	Maryland (14–3)	Maryland (16–3)	Maryland (18–3)	Maryland (19–3)	Duke (23–2)	Duke (25–2)	Duke (26–3)	Oklahoma (27–4)	Indiana (25–12)	3.
4.	Kentucky	UCLA (0–0)	UCLA (0–0)	Maryland (3–1)	Florida (4–1)	Florida (6–1)	Kansas (8–1)	Virginia (8–0)	Virginia (9–0)	Maryland (11–2)	Kansas (13–2)	Florida (15–2)	Cincinnati (19–1)	Oklahoma (17–3)	Oklahoma (19–3)	Cincinnati (24–2)	Cincinnati (26–2)	Oklahoma (24–4)	Maryland (26–4)	Oklahoma (31–5)	4.
5.	Florida	Kansas (0–0)	Maryland (2–1)	Missouri (5–0)	Kansas (4–1)	Kansas (6–1)	Virginia (5–0)	Oklahoma State (12–0)	Oklahoma State (13–0)	Virginia (9–1)	Oklahoma (13–1)	Cincinnati (17–1)	Virginia (14–3)	Cincinnati (20–2)	Cincinnati (22–2)	Oklahoma (20–4)	Oklahoma (22–4)	Cincinnati (27–3)	Cincinnati (30–3)	Duke (31–4)	5.
6.	UCLA	Maryland (1–1)	Florida (2–1)	Florida (2–1)	Illinois (6–1)	Virginia (5–0)	Oklahoma State (9–0)	Maryland (8–2)	Maryland (10–2)	Oklahoma State (13–1)	Oklahoma State (15–1)	Oklahoma (14–2)	Florida (15–3)	Cincinnati (20–2)	Florida (18–4)	Alabama (22–4)	Alabama (23–5)	Gonzaga (28–3)	Gonzaga (29–3)	Connecticut (27–7) т	6.
7.	Kansas	Florida (1–1)	Arizona (3–0)	Kansas (2–1)	Virginia (4–0)	Arizona (5–1)	Illinois (8–2)	Illinois (10–2)	Illinois (11–2)	Oklahoma (11–1)	Syracuse (15–2)	Virginia (12–2)	Oklahoma (15–3)	Alabama (19–3)	Alabama (20–4)	Gonzaga (24–3)	Gonzaga (26–3)	Pittsburgh (25–4)	Pittsburgh (27–5)	Oregon (26–9) т	7.
8.	Iowa	Missouri (0–0)	Iowa (3–0)	Virginia (3–0)	Arizona (3–1)	Illinois (7–2)	Kentucky (6–1)	Kentucky (7–2)	Kentucky (8–2)	Syracuse (13–2)	Cincinnati (15–1)	Illinois (14–4)	Alabama (17–3)	Virginia (14–5)	Gonzaga (22–3)	Florida (19–5)	Pittsburgh (23–4)	Alabama (24–6)	Arizona (22–9) т	Cincinnati (31–4)	8.
9.	Missouri	Saint Joseph's (0–0)	Missouri (2–0)	Stanford (3–0)	Syracuse (8–0)	Oklahoma State (9–0)	Missouri (9–1)	Iowa (10–3)	Iowa (11–3)	Kentucky (9–3)	Virginia (10–2)	Kentucky (12–4)	Oklahoma State (17–3)	Kentucky (15–5)	Kentucky (16–6)	Marquette (22–3)	Marquette (23–4)	Oregon (22–7)	Alabama (26–7) т	Pittsburgh (29–6)	9.
10.	Saint Joseph's	Iowa (0–0)	Virginia (2–0)	Syracuse (5–0)	Oklahoma State (8–0)	Kentucky (5–1)	Arizona (5–2)	Missouri (9–2)	Syracuse (11–2)	Illinois (12–3)	Illinois (13–4)	Syracuse (16–3)	Syracuse (17–4)	Gonzaga (20–3)	Arizona (17–6)	Pittsburgh (22–4)	Florida (20–6)	Marquette (24–5)	Marquette (26–6)	Arizona (24–10)	10.
11.	Virginia	Virginia (0–0)	Michigan State (2–0)	UCLA (2–1)	Iowa (6–2)	Boston College (7–0)	Boston College (9–0)	Syracuse (10–2)	Oklahoma (10–1)	Stanford (8–3)	UCLA (12–3)	Oklahoma State (15–3)	Kentucky (13–5)	Miami (FL) (19–3)	Miami (FL) (20–4)	Stanford (17–6)	Kentucky (19–7)	Kentucky (20–8)	Oregon (23–8)	Illinois (26–9)	11.
12.	Michigan State	Arizona (2–0)	Kentucky (1–1)	Oklahoma State (6–0)	Kentucky (3–1)	Syracuse (9–1)	Iowa (9–3)	Michigan State (9–3)	Boston College (11–1)	Cincinnati (13–1)	Kentucky (10–4)	Arizona (13–4)	Illinois (15–5)	Oklahoma State (17–5)	Marquette (21–3)	Kentucky (17–7)	Oklahoma State (22–6)	Florida (21–7)	Ohio State (23–7)	Kent State (30–6)	12.
13.	Memphis	Michigan State (0–0)	Stanford (1–0)	Iowa (4–1)	Boston College (5–0)	Stanford (3–1)	Stanford (4–1)	Boston College (11–1)	Stanford (7–2)	Iowa (12–4)	Wake Forest (13–3)	UCLA (13–4)	UCLA (14–5)	Arizona (15–6)	Virginia (15–6)	Miami (FL) (21–5)	Oregon (20–7)	Oklahoma State (23–7)	Connecticut (24–6)	Kentucky (22–10)	13.
14.	Georgetown	Memphis (0–0)	Memphis (3–0)	Kentucky (2–1)	Stanford (3–1)	Georgetown (6–1)	Syracuse (9–2)	Oklahoma (9–1)	Arizona (8–3)	UCLA (11–2)	Gonzaga (15–2)	Alabama (16–3) т	Gonzaga (18–3)	Illinois (15–7)	Stanford (15–6)	Oklahoma State (20–6)	Arizona (18–8)	Arizona (19–9)	Florida (22–8)	Alabama (27–8)	14.
15.	Stanford	Georgetown (0–0)	Georgetown (1–0)	Boston College (3–0)	Georgetown (5–1)	Iowa (7–3)	Marquette (9–0)	Stanford (6–2)	UCLA (9–2)	Alabama (13–2)	Iowa (13–5)	Stanford (11–4) т	Stanford (12–5)	Oregon (17–5)	Oklahoma State (18–6)	Virginia (16–7)	Georgia (20–7)	Illinois (23–7)	Kentucky (20–9)	Missouri (24–12)	15.
16.	Boston College	Stanford (0–0)	Oklahoma State (2–0)	Georgetown (3–1)	Fresno State (6–1) т	Marquette (9–0)	Georgetown (8–1)	Arizona (6–3)	Cincinnati (12–1)	Boston College (12–2)	Stanford (9–4)	Wake Forest (13–5)	Miami (FL) (18–2)	Wake Forest (16–6)	Pittsburgh (21–4)	Arizona (17–8)	Illinois (21–7)	Miami (FL) (23–6)	Illinois (24–8) т	Gonzaga (29–4)	16.
17.	Temple	Boston College (0–0)	Boston College (1–0)	Michigan State (2–2)	Michigan State (4–2) т	UCLA (4–2)	Michigan State (6–3)	UCLA (7–2)	Michigan State (9–4)	Missouri (11–3)	Alabama (14–3)	Georgia (15–3)	Georgia (16–4)	Syracuse (17–6)	Wake Forest (17–7)	Oregon (18–7)	Ohio State (19–6)	Ohio State (20–7)	USC (22–9) т	Ohio State (24–8)	17.
18.	Oklahoma State	Oklahoma State (0–0)	Syracuse (3–0)	Western Kentucky (4–0)	UCLA (2–2)	Saint Joseph's (5–1)	Saint Joseph's (6–1)	Georgetown (9–2)	Missouri (9–3)	Gonzaga (12–2)	Arizona (11–4)	Gonzaga (16–3)	Arizona (13–6)	UCLA (15–6)	Oregon (17–7)	Ohio State (18–5)	Miami (FL) (21–6)	Stanford (19–8)	Mississippi State (26–7)	Marquette (26–7)	18.
19.	North Carolina	Syracuse (0–0)	Saint Joseph's (1–1)	Memphis (4–2)	Alabama (5–1)	Michigan State (5–3)	UCLA (5–2)	Marquette (10–1)	Alabama (10–2)	Wake Forest (11–3)	Missouri (12–4)	Miami (FL) (17–2)	Wake Forest (14–6)	Georgia (17–5)	Illinois (17–7)	Illinois (19–7)	Stanford (17–8)	Georgia (21–8)	Xavier (25–5)	Texas (22–12)	19.
20.	Syracuse	Indiana (0–0) т	Indiana (1–0)	Fresno State (3–1)	Ball State (4–1)	Wake Forest (6–2)	Wake Forest (7–2)	Cincinnati (11–1)	Butler (13–0)	Miami (FL) (14–1)	Miami (FL) (15–2)	Missouri (14–4)	USC (15–4)	Stanford (13–6)	Ohio State (17–5)	Georgia (19–7)	USC (19–7)	USC (20–8)	Western Kentucky (28–3)	UCLA (21–12)	20.
21.	Indiana	North Carolina (0–0) т	Fresno State (2–0)	Saint Joseph's (2–1)	Marquette (7–0)	Alabama (6–2)	Oklahoma (7–1)	Alabama (9–2)	Miami (FL) (13–0)	Arizona (9–4)	Boston College (13–3)	Oregon (14–4)	Pittsburgh (18–3)	Pittsburgh (19–4)	Syracuse (18–7)	Wake Forest (18–8)	Indiana (18–9)	Western Kentucky (26–3)	Miami (FL) (24–7)	Mississippi State (27–8)	21.
22.	Texas	Texas (0–0)	Alabama (2–0)	Alabama (3–1)	Wake Forest (5–1)	Oklahoma (5–1)	Alabama (7–2)	Gonzaga (10–2)	Gonzaga (11–2)	Michigan State (9–5)	Oregon (12–4)	USC (14–3)	Connecticut (14–3)	Ohio State (17–3)	Georgia (18–6)	USC (18–6)	Wake Forest (18–10)	Indiana (19–10)	Oklahoma State (23–8)	Southern Illinois (28–8)	22.
23.	Oklahoma	USC (0–0)	Oklahoma (1–1)	Wake Forest (4–1)	Memphis (6–2)	Ball State (5–2)	Ball State (6–2)	Miami (FL) (11–0)	Georgetown (9–3)	Butler (13–1)	Georgia (14–2)	Ohio State (14–2)	Texas Tech (15–3)	Marquette (19–3)	UCLA (16–7)	Indiana (17–8)	Western Kentucky (25–3)	Xavier (22–5)	Stanford (19–9)	Florida (22–9)	23.
24.	USC	Oklahoma (0–0)	Texas (0–1)	Indiana (3–1)	Saint Joseph's (4–1)	Indiana (6–2)	Gonzaga (9–2)	Butler (11–0)	Wake Forest (9–3)	Mississippi State (14–1)	USC (13–2)	Iowa (13–7)	Missouri (15–5)	USC (16–5)	Indiana (16–7)	Xavier (19–4)	Xavier (20–5)	Connecticut (21–6)	Hawaii (27–5)	Xavier (26–6)	24.
25.	Fresno State	Temple (0–2)	Western Kentucky (2–0)	Ball State (2–1)	Western Kentucky (4–2)	Western Kentucky (6–2)	Cincinnati (7–1)	Wake Forest (8–3)	Marquette (11–2)	Pittsburgh (14–1)	Butler (15–2)	Pittsburgh (16–3)	Indiana (13–6)	Texas Tech (16–4)	USC (16–6)	Syracuse (19–7)	California (20–5)	California (21–7)	NC State (22–10)	NC State (23–11)	25.
	Preseason	Week 1 Nov. 13	Week 2 Nov. 20	Week 3 Nov. 27	Week 4 Dec. 4	Week 5 Dec. 11	Week 6 Dec. 18	Week 7 Dec. 25	Week 8 Jan. 1	Week 9 Jan. 8	Week 10 Jan. 15	Week 11 Jan. 22	Week 12 Jan. 29	Week 13 Feb. 5	Week 14 Feb. 12	Week 15 Feb. 19	Week 16 Feb. 26	Week 17 Mar. 5	Week 18 Mar. 12	Final Apr. 1	
		Dropped: Fresno State	Dropped: North Carolina (0–2); USC (1–1); Temple (0–2)	Dropped: Oklahoma; Texas	Dropped: Indiana (4–2)	Dropped: Fresno State; Memphis	Dropped: Indiana; Western Kentucky	Dropped: Saint Joseph's; Ball State	None	Dropped: Georgetown; Marquette	Dropped: Pittsburgh; Mississippi State; Michigan State	Dropped: Butler	Dropped: Oregon; Ohio State; Iowa	Dropped: Connecticut; Missouri; Indiana	Dropped: Texas Tech	Dropped: UCLA	Dropped: Virginia; Syracuse	Dropped: Wake Forest	Dropped: Georgia; Indiana; California	Dropped: USC (22–10); Western Kentucky (28–4); Miami (FL) (24–8); Oklahoma State (23–9); Stanford (19–10); Hawaii (27–6)	
