= 2001–02 Temple Owls men's basketball team =

American college basketball season

2001–02 Temple Owls men's basketball

2002 National Invitation Tournament, Semifinal
- Conference: Atlantic 10 Conference
- Record: 19–15 (12–4 A-10)
- Head coach: John Chaney (20th season)
- Assistant coach: Dan Leibovitz (6th season)
- Home arena: Liacouras Center

2001–02 Atlantic 10 men's basketball standings
	Conf.				Overall
Team	W		L	PCT	W		L	PCT
East
Saint Joseph's	12	–	4	.750	19	–	12	.613
Temple	12	–	4	.750	19	–	15	.559
St. Bonaventure	8	–	8	.500	17	–	13	.567
UMass	6	–	10	.375	13	–	16	.448
Fordham	4	–	12	.250	8	–	20	.286
Rhode Island	4	–	12	.250	8	–	20	.286
West
No. 22 Xavier †	14	–	2	.875	26	–	6	.813
Richmond	11	–	5	.688	22	–	14	.611
Dayton	10	–	6	.625	21	–	11	.656
La Salle	6	–	10	.375	15	–	17	.469
George Washington	5	–	11	.313	12	–	16	.429
Duquesne	4	–	12	.250	9	–	19	.321
† 2002 Atlantic 10 Tournament winner Rankings from AP Poll

The 2001–02 Temple Owls men's basketball team represented Temple University in the 2001–02 NCAA Division I men's basketball season. They were led by head coach John Chaney in his 20th year. The Owls played their home games at the Liacouras Center. Temple was a member of the Atlantic 10 Conference. They finished the season 19–15, 12–4 in A-10 play. The Owls were invited to the 2002 National Invitation Tournament where they went 4–1, making the semifinals and winning the 3rd place consolation game.

== Roster ==
#	Name	Height	Weight (lbs.)	Position	Class	Hometown
1	Greg Jefferson	6 ft 5 in (1.96 m)	220 (100 kg)	F	Jr.	Los Angeles, California
2	Wilbur Allen	6 ft 4 in (1.93 m)	200 (91 kg)	G	Fr.	Mouth of Wilson, Virginia
3	Brian Polk	6 ft 4 in (1.93 m)	210 (95 kg)	G	So.	Georgetown, Delaware
4	Nile Murry	6 ft 4 in (1.93 m)	208 (94 kg)	G	Fr.	Houston, Texas
14	Lynn Greer	6 ft 2 in (1.88 m)	175 (79 kg)	G	Sr.	Philadelphia, Pennsylvania
21	Hawley Smith	6 ft 6 in (1.89 m)	225 (102 kg)	F	Fr.	Jacksonville, Florida
22	Steve Tulleners	6 ft 3 in (1.91 m)	185 (84 kg)	G	Fr.	Unionville, Pennsylvania
22	Jay Jameson	6 ft 1 in (1.85 m)		G	Sr.	
23	Alex Wesby	6 ft 6 in (1.89 m)	195 (88 kg)	F	Jr.	Philadelphia, Pennsylvania
30	Ron Rollerson	6 ft 10 in (2.08 m)	290 (132 kg)	C	Sr.	Pennsauken, New Jersey
34	David Hawkins	6 ft 5 in (1.96 m)	215 (98 kg)	G	So.	Washington, D.C.
42	Kevin Lyde	6 ft 10 in (2.08 m)	260 (118 kg)	F	Sr.	Washington, D.C.
44	Glen Elliott	6 ft 9 in (2.05 m)	260 (118 kg)	C	Fr.	Atlantic Beach, Florida
