= Boban Savović =

Montenegrin basketball player

JL Bourg
- League: LNB Pro A

Personal information
- Born: November 27, 1979 (age 46) Šibenik, SR Croatia, SFR Yugoslavia
- Listed height: 6 ft 5 in (1.96 m)
- Listed weight: 230 lb (104 kg)

Career information
- High school: East Side (Newark, New Jersey)
- College: Ohio State (1998–2002)
- NBA draft: 2002: undrafted
- Playing career: 2002–2006
- Position: Shooting guard

Career history

Playing
- 2002: Partizan
- 2002–2004: Roanne
- 2004–2006: JL Bourg-en-Bresse

Coaching
- 2011–2012: Primorje
- 2012–2013: Teodo Tivat
- 2014: KB Peja
- 2018–2021: JL Bourg (assistant)
- 2022–2023: JL Bourg
- 2023–present: JL Bourg (assistant)
Medals
Men's basketball
Representing FR Yugoslavia
U18 European Championship
Bronze medal – third place	1996 France	U18 National Team

Slobodan "Boban" Savović (born November 27, 1979) is a Montenegrin professional basketball coach and former player. He is currently working as an assistant coach for JL Bourg of LNB Pro A.

== Early career ==
Raised in Serbia and Montenegro, Savović came to the United States in 1994 and played at East Side High School in Newark, New Jersey. In 1996, Savović represented Serbia and Montenegro in the FIBA European Championship for Junior Men. After a standout career there, he was signed by Ohio State. During his freshman year, he was one of the top contributors off the bench in the Buckeyes' run to the 1999 Final Four. He missed most of the 1999–2000 season due to ankle and leg injuries, but was a starter the next two years. A deadly three-point shooter, he left Ohio State fifth all-time in career three-pointers with 125.

=== Scandal at Ohio State ===
Two years after Savović left Ohio State, he played a role in a scandal that ended the career of Buckeyes coach Jim O'Brien. In June 2004, Kathleen Salyers, a nanny from the Columbus suburb of Gahanna, sued Ohio State boosters Dan and Kim Roslovic. Salyers claimed that the Roslovics agreed to pay Salyers $1,000 per month plus expenses to care for Savović. Salyers claimed the Roslovics reneged on that agreement. Savović couldn't live with the Roslovics due to their status as Ohio State boosters. Salyers also alleged that O'Brien not only knew about these arrangements, but also knew Savović was receiving improper payments and that she did much of Savović's homework for three years because of his difficulties with English.

O'Brien had been fired due to a separate revelation by Salyers that he'd given $6,000 to one-time recruit Aleksandar Radojević. However, the revelations about Savović led to a separate NCAA investigation. Ultimately, Ohio State was placed on three years' probation and forced to vacate every game in which Savović played (including the 1999 Final Four).

== Professional career ==
After going undrafted in the 2002 NBA draft, he played professionally for four years in Serbia and France.

== Personal life ==
He is the younger brother of former Denver Nuggets player Predrag Savović.
