= 2001–02 Texas Tech Red Raiders basketball team =

American college basketball season

2001–02 Texas Tech Red Raiders basketball

NCAA Division I men's basketball tournament First round, L, 76–68 v. Southern Illinois
- Conference: Big 12 Conference
- South
- Record: 23–9 (10–6 Big 12)
- Head coach: Bob Knight (1st season)
- Assistant coaches: Pat Knight (1st season); Chris Beard (1st season); Bob Beyer (1st season)
- Home arena: United Spirit Arena

2001–02 Big 12 men's basketball standings
	Conf.				Overall
Team	W		L	PCT	W		L	PCT
No. 2 Kansas	16	–	0	1.000	33	–	4	.892
No. 3 Oklahoma †	13	–	3	.813	31	–	5	.861
Texas	10	–	6	.625	22	–	12	.647
No. 20 Oklahoma State	10	–	6	.625	23	–	9	.719
Texas Tech	10	–	6	.625	23	–	9	.719
Missouri	9	–	7	.563	24	–	12	.667
Kansas State	6	–	10	.375	13	–	16	.448
Nebraska	6	–	10	.375	13	–	15	.464
Colorado	5	–	11	.313	15	–	14	.517
Baylor	4	–	12	.250	14	–	16	.467
Iowa State	4	–	12	.250	12	–	19	.387
Texas A&M	3	–	13	.188	9	–	22	.290
† 2002 Big 12 Tournament winner Rankings from AP poll

The 2001–02 Texas Tech Red Raiders men's basketball team represented Texas Tech University in the Big 12 Conference during the 2001–02 NCAA Division I men's basketball season. The head coach was Bob Knight, his first year with the team. Knight replaced James Dickey, who was fired after four consecutive losing seasons while Texas Tech was under NCAA probation. The Red Raiders played their home games in the United Spirit Arena in Lubbock, Texas.

== Roster ==
2001–02 Texas Tech Red Raiders men's basketball team
Players
Coaches

Pos.	#	Name	Height	Weight	Year	Hometown
G	14	Andre Emmett	6 ft 5 in (1.96 m)	230 lb (104 kg)	So	Dallas, Texas
G	15	Ronald Ross	6 ft 2 in (1.88 m)	185 lb (84 kg)	Fr	Hobbs, New Mexico
F	22	Kasib Powell	6 ft 7 in (2.01 m)	215 lb (98 kg)	Jr	Teaneck, New Jersey
C	55	Andy Ellis	6 ft 11 in (2.11 m)	225 lb (102 kg)	Sr	Lamesa, Texas

Head coach

- Bob Knight

Assistant coach(es)

- Pat Knight
- Chris Beard
- Bob Beyer

Legend

- (C) Team captain
- (S) Suspended
- (I) Ineligible
- (W) Walk-on
- Injured
- Current redshirt

== Schedule and results ==
Date time, TV	Rank^{#}	Opponent^{#}	Result	Record	Site city, state
Exhibition
Nov 2, 2001*; 7:15 p.m.		EA Sports All-Stars	W 81–76		United Spirit Arena; Lubbock, Texas
Nov 11, 2001*; 2:15 p.m.		Athletes First	W 83–68		United Spirit Arena; Lubbock, Texas
Regular Season
Nov 16, 2001*; 7:15 p.m.		William & Mary; Ford Red Raider Classic	W 75–55	1–0	United Spirit Arena; Lubbock, Texas
Nov 17, 2001*; 9:15 p.m.		San Diego State; Ford Red Raider Classic	W 81–71	2–0	United Spirit Arena; Lubbock, Texas
Nov 20, 2001*; 7:35 p.m.		at SMU	W 78–75	3–0	Moody Coliseum; Dallas, Texas
Nov 24, 2001*; 8:15 p.m.		Sam Houston State	L 65–69	3–1	United Spirit Arena; Lubbock, Texas
Nov 26, 2001*; 7:15 p.m.		UTEP	W 81–56	4–1	United Spirit Arena; Lubbock, Texas
Nov 28 2001*; 8:05 p.m.		at New Mexico State	W 81–80 ^{OT}	5–1	Pan American Center; Las Cruces, New Mexico
Dec 1, 2001*; 4:00 p.m.		TCU	W 99–86	6–1	United Spirit Arena; Lubbock, Texas
Dec 14, 2001*; 9:00 p.m.		at Houston	W 71–64	7–1	Compaq Center; Houston, Texas
Dec 17, 2001*; 7:15 p.m.		Louisiana–Lafayette	W 89–72	8–1	United Spirit Arena; Lubbock, Texas
Dec 22, 2001*; 12:15 p.m.		Stetson	W 101–47	9–1	United Spirit Arena; Lubbock, Texas
Dec 30, 2001*; 3:15 p.m.		Minnesota	W 80–60	10–1	United Spirit Arena; Lubbock, Texas
Jan 1, 2002*; 2:15 p.m.		Wyoming	W 90–84	11–1	United Spirit Arena; Lubbock, Texas
Jan 6, 2002; 1:00 p.m.		Kansas State	W 74–49	12–1 (1–0)	United Spirit Arena; Lubbock, Texas
Jan 9, 2002; 7:30 p.m.		at Texas A&M	W 72–70	13–1 (2–0)	Reed Arena; College Station, Texas
Jan 12, 2002; 12:45 p.m.		at No. 5 Oklahoma	L 72–98	13–2 (2–1)	Lloyd Noble Center; Norman, Oklahoma
Jan 14, 2002; 8:00 p.m.		Texas	L 71–74 ^{OT}	13–3 (2–2)	United Spirit Arena; Lubbock, Texas
Jan 19, 2002; 3:00 p.m.		No. 6 Oklahoma State	W 94–70	14–3 (3–2)	United Spirit Arena (15,098); Lubbock, Texas
Jan 26, 2002; 12:00 p.m.		No. 6 Oklahoma	W 92–79	15–3 (4–2)	United Spirit Arena (15,098); Lubbock, Texas
Jan 30, 2002; 7:05 p.m.	No. 20	at Nebraska	L 69–80	15–4 (4–3)	Nebraska Coliseum; Lincoln, Nebraska
Feb 2, 2002; 12:45 p.m.	No. 20	Iowa State	W 69–43	16–4 (5–3)	United Spirit Arena; Lubbock, Texas
Feb 6, 2002; 7:00 p.m.	No. 24	at No. 14 Oklahoma State	L 62–64	16–5 (5–4)	Gallagher-Iba Arena (13,611); Stillwater, Oklahoma
Feb 9, 2002; 3:00 p.m.	No. 24	at No. 2 Kansas	L 81–108	16–6 (5–5)	Allen Fieldhouse; Lawrence, Kansas
Feb 12, 2002; 8:15 p.m.		Baylor	W 90–65	17–6 (6–5)	United Spirit Arena; Lubbock, Texas
Feb 16, 2002; 3:00 p.m.		at Colorado	W 97–79	18–6 (7–5)	Coors Events Center; Boulder, Colorado
Feb 20, 2002; 8:15 p.m.		Missouri	W 91–68	19–6 (8–5)	United Spirit Arena (14,426); Lubbock, Texas
Feb 23, 2002; 12:45 p.m.		Texas A&M	W 74–53	20–6 (9–5)	United Spirit Arena; Lubbock, Texas
Feb 26, 2002; 8:00 p.m.		at Texas	L 71–96	20–7 (9–6)	Frank Erwin Center; Austin, Texas
Mar 2, 2002; 12:45 p.m.		at Baylor	W 91–89	21–7 (10–6)	Ferrell Center; Waco, Texas
Big 12 Tournament
Mar 7, 2002*; 2:20 p.m.	(5)	vs. (12) Texas A&M; Big 12 Tournament First Round	W 80–71	22–7	Kemper Arena; Kansas City, Missouri
Mar 8, 2002*; 2:20 p.m.	(5)	vs. (4) No. 14 Oklahoma State; Big 12 Tournament Quarterfinal	W 73–51	23–7	Kemper Arena (18,848); Kansas City, Missouri
Mar 9, 2002*; 1:00 p.m.	(5)	vs. (1) No. 1 Kansas; Big 12 Tournament Semifinal	L 50–90	23–8	Kemper Arena (18,848); Kansas City, Missouri
NCAA Tournament
Mar 15, 2002*; 6:50 p.m.	(6 E)	vs. (11 E) Southern Illinois; First Round	L 68–76	23–9	United Center; Chicago, Illinois
*Non-conference game. ^{#}Rankings from AP Poll. (#) Tournament seedings in parentheses. E=East. All times are in Central Time.
