= 2001–02 Oklahoma State Cowboys basketball team =

American college basketball season

2001–02 Oklahoma State Cowboys basketball

NCAA tournament, first round
- Conference: Big 12 Conference

Ranking
- AP: No. 20
- Record: 23–9 (10–6 Big 12)
- Head coach: Eddie Sutton (12th season)
- Assistant coaches: Sean Sutton; Kyle Keller (3rd season)
- Home arena: Gallagher-Iba Arena (Capacity: 6,381)

2001–02 Big 12 men's basketball standings
	Conf.				Overall
Team	W		L	PCT	W		L	PCT
No. 2 Kansas	16	–	0	1.000	33	–	4	.892
No. 3 Oklahoma †	13	–	3	.813	31	–	5	.861
Texas	10	–	6	.625	22	–	12	.647
No. 20 Oklahoma State	10	–	6	.625	23	–	9	.719
Texas Tech	10	–	6	.625	23	–	9	.719
Missouri	9	–	7	.563	24	–	12	.667
Kansas State	6	–	10	.375	13	–	16	.448
Nebraska	6	–	10	.375	13	–	15	.464
Colorado	5	–	11	.313	15	–	14	.517
Baylor	4	–	12	.250	14	–	16	.467
Iowa State	4	–	12	.250	12	–	19	.387
Texas A&M	3	–	13	.188	9	–	22	.290
† 2002 Big 12 Tournament winner Rankings from AP poll

The 2001–02 Oklahoma State Cowboys basketball team represented Oklahoma State University as a member of the Big 12 Conference during the 2001–02 NCAA Division I men's basketball season. They were led by 12th-year head coach Eddie Sutton and played their home games at Gallagher-Iba Arena in Stillwater, Oklahoma. They finished the season 23–9, 10–6 in Big 12 play to finish in fourth place. The Cowboys lost to Missouri in the quarterfinals of the Big 12 tournament. The team received an at-large bid to the NCAA tournament as the No. 7 seed in the South region. Oklahoma State lost to No. 10 seed Kent State in the opening round.

== Roster ==
2001–02 Oklahoma State Cowboys men's basketball team
Players
Coaches

Pos.	#	Name	Height	Weight	Year	Previous school	Hometown
G	1	Maurice Baker	6 ft 1 in (1.85 m)	180 lb (82 kg)	Sr	Madison, Illinois
G	5	Victor Williams	5 ft 10 in (1.78 m)	—	Jr
F	23	Ivan McFarlin	6 ft 8 in (2.03 m)	240 lb (109 kg)	Fr	Houston, Texas
G	34	Melvin Sanders	6 ft 5 in (1.96 m)	210 lb (95 kg)	So	Liberal, Kansas

Head coach

- Eddie Sutton

Assistant coach(es)

- Sean Sutton
- Kyle Keller

Legend

- (C) Team captain
- (S) Suspended
- (I) Ineligible
- (W) Walk-on
- Injured
- Current redshirt

== Schedule and results ==
Date time, TV	Rank^{#}	Opponent^{#}	Result	Record	Site city, state
Exhibition
Nov 6, 2001*; 7:00 p.m.		Athletes First	W 92–88		Gallagher-Iba Arena; Stillwater, Oklahoma
Nov 10, 2001*; 7:00 p.m.		EA Sports All-Stars	W 89–77		Gallagher-Iba Arena; Stillwater, Oklahoma
Regular season
Nov 16, 2001*; 8:00 p.m.	No. 18	Cincinnati	W 69–62	1–0	Gallagher-Iba Arena (13,611); Stillwater, Oklahoma
Nov 17, 2001*; 2:00 p.m.	No. 18	Austin Peay	W 81–58	2–0	Gallagher-Iba Arena (8,512); Stillwater, Oklahoma
Nov 19, 2001*; 7:00 p.m.	No. 15	vs. Providence; Las Vegas Tournament	W 83–65	3–0	Valley High School (557); Las Vegas, Nevada
Nov 20, 2001*; 7:00 p.m.	No. 15	vs. Siena; Las Vegas Tournament	W 82–64	4–0	Valley High School (580); Las Vegas, Nevada
Nov 21, 2001*; 9:30 p.m.	No. 15	vs. TCU; Las Vegas Tournament	W 95–77	5–0	Valley High School (560); Las Vegas, Nevada
Nov 24, 2001*; 7:00 p.m.	No. 15	North Texas	W 77–58	6–0	Gallagher-Iba Arena (7,758); Stillwater, Oklahoma
Nov 29, 2001*; 7:00 p.m.	No. 14	New Orleans	W 95–47	7–0	Gallagher-Iba Arena (11,898); Stillwater, Oklahoma
Dec 1, 2001*; 7:00 p.m.	No. 14	Wichita State	W 61–59	8–0	Gallagher-Iba Arena (12,201); Stillwater, Oklahoma
Dec 8, 2001*; 7:00 p.m.	No. 10	Jackson State	W 90–41	9–0	Gallagher-Iba Arena (11,972); Stillwater, Oklahoma
Dec 17, 2001*; 8:00 p.m.	No. 6	Northwestern State	W 79–44	10–0	Gallagher-Iba Arena (10,512); Stillwater, Oklahoma
Dec 19, 2001*; 7:00 p.m.	No. 6	at UMKC	W 62–50	11–0	Municipal Auditorium (8,643); Kansas City, Missouri
Dec 22, 2001*; 1:00 p.m.	No. 6	vs. Arkansas	W 85–76	12–0	Alltel Arena (17,021); North Little Rock, Arkansas
Dec 29, 2001*; 6:00 p.m.	No. 5	vs. Ball State; All-College Classic	W 82–70	13–0	Myriad Convention Center (13,648); Oklahoma City, Oklahoma
Jan 5, 2002; 3:00 p.m., ESPN Plus	No. 5	Texas	L 60–71	13–1 (0–1)	Gallagher-Iba Arena (13,611); Stillwater, Oklahoma
Jan 8, 2002; 7:00 p.m.	No. 6	at Baylor	W 68–57	14–1 (1–1)	Ferrell Center (7,088); Waco, Texas
Jan 12, 2002; 4:00 p.m., ESPN	No. 6	at Iowa State	W 69–66	15–1 (2–1)	Hilton Coliseum (13,226); Ames, Iowa
Jan 15, 2002; 8:00 p.m.	No. 6	No. 4 Kansas	L 61–79	15–2 (2–2)	Gallagher-Iba Arena (13,611); Stillwater, Oklahoma
Jan 19, 2002; 3:00 p.m.	No. 6	at Texas Tech	L 70–94	15–3 (2–3)	United Spirit Arena (15,098); Lubbock, Texas
Jan 23, 2002; 7:00 p.m.	No. 11	Nebraska	W 70–63	16–3 (3–3)	Gallagher-Iba Arena (12,517); Stillwater, Oklahoma
Jan 26, 2002; 3:00 p.m.	No. 11	Colorado	W 64–55	17–3 (4–3)	Gallagher-Iba Arena (11,498); Stillwater, Oklahoma
Jan 30, 2002; 8:00 p.m., ESPN Plus	No. 9	at No. 6 Oklahoma; Bedlam Series	L 53–58	17–4 (4–4)	Lloyd Noble Center (12,145); Norman, Oklahoma
Feb 2, 2002; 12:45 p.m.	No. 9	at Kansas State	L 61–70	17–5 (4–5)	Bramlage Coliseum (8,393); Manhattan, Kansas
Feb 6, 2002; 7:00 p.m.	No. 14	No. 24 Texas Tech	W 64–62	18–5 (5–5)	Gallagher-Iba Arena (13,611); Stillwater, Oklahoma
Feb 10, 2002*; 1:30 p.m.	No. 14	at Fresno State	L 52–58	18–6	Selland Arena (10,220); Fresno, California
Feb 13, 2002; 8:00 p.m., ESPN Plus	No. 16	No. 4 Oklahoma; Bedlam Series	W 79–72 ^{OT}	19–6 (6–5)	Gallagher-Iba Arena (13,611); Stillwater, Oklahoma
Feb 16, 2002; 5:00 p.m.	No. 16	at Texas A&M	W 71–66	20–6 (7–5)	Reed Arena (6,750); College Station, Texas
Feb 20, 2002; 7:00 p.m.	No. 13	at Texas	W 85–80	21–6 (8–5)	Frank Erwin Center (10,011); Austin, Texas
Feb 23, 2002; 3:00 p.m.	No. 13	Baylor	W 77–64	22–6 (9–5)	Gallagher-Iba Arena (12,611); Stillwater, Oklahoma
Feb 25, 2002; 8:00 p.m.	No. 13	at Missouri	L 69–72	22–7 (9–6)	Hearnes Center (12,374); Columbia, Missouri
Mar 2, 2002; 7:00 p.m.	No. 12	Texas A&M	W 66–51	23–7 (10–6)	Gallagher-Iba Arena (10,706); Stillwater, Oklahoma
Big 12 Tournament
Mar 8, 2002*; 2:30 p.m.	No. 14	vs. Texas Tech; Quarterfinals	L 51–73	23–8	Kemper Arena (18,848); Kansas City, Missouri
NCAA Tournament
Mar 14, 2002*; 11:20 a.m.	(7 S) No. 20	vs. (10 S) Kent State; First round	L 61–69	23–9	BI-LO Center (13,194); Greenville, South Carolina
*Non-conference game. ^{#}Rankings from AP poll. (#) Tournament seedings in parentheses. S=South. All times are in Central Time.
