= 2001–02 Oklahoma Sooners men's basketball team =

American college basketball season

2001–02 Oklahoma Sooners men's basketball

Big 12 tournament champions

NCAA tournament, Final Four
- Conference: Big 12 Conference

Ranking
- Coaches: No. 4
- AP: No. 3
- Record: 31–5 (13–3 Big 12)
- Head coach: Kelvin Sampson (8th season)
- Assistant coaches: Ray Lopes; Bennie Seltzer; Jim Shaw
- Home arena: Lloyd Noble Center (Capacity: 12,000)

2001–02 Big 12 men's basketball standings
	Conf.				Overall
Team	W		L	PCT	W		L	PCT
No. 2 Kansas	16	–	0	1.000	33	–	4	.892
No. 3 Oklahoma †	13	–	3	.813	31	–	5	.861
Texas	10	–	6	.625	22	–	12	.647
No. 20 Oklahoma State	10	–	6	.625	23	–	9	.719
Texas Tech	10	–	6	.625	23	–	9	.719
Missouri	9	–	7	.563	24	–	12	.667
Kansas State	6	–	10	.375	13	–	16	.448
Nebraska	6	–	10	.375	13	–	15	.464
Colorado	5	–	11	.313	15	–	14	.517
Baylor	4	–	12	.250	14	–	16	.467
Iowa State	4	–	12	.250	12	–	19	.387
Texas A&M	3	–	13	.188	9	–	22	.290
† 2002 Big 12 Tournament winner Rankings from AP poll

The 2001–02 Oklahoma Sooners men's basketball team represented the University of Oklahoma. The head coach was Kelvin Sampson. The team played its home games in the Lloyd Noble Center and was a member of the Big 12 Conference.

== Roster ==
2001–02 Oklahoma Sooners men's basketball team
Players
Coaches

Pos.	#	Name	Height	Weight	Year	Previous school	Hometown
G	2	Ebi Ere	6 ft 5 in (1.96 m)	215 lb (98 kg)	Jr	McLain	Tulsa, OK
G	4	Quannas White	6 ft 1 in (1.85 m)	190 lb (86 kg)	Jr	St. Augustine	New Orleans, LA
G	10	Hollis Price	6 ft 1 in (1.85 m)	165 lb (75 kg)	Jr	St. Augustine	New Orleans, LA
F	13	Aaron McGhee	6 ft 8 in (2.03 m)	250 lb (113 kg)	Sr	East	Aurora, IL
C	21	Jabahri Brown	6 ft 10 in (2.08 m)	210 lb (95 kg)	So	Champagnat Catholic	St. Thomas, VI
F	24	Daryan Selvy	6 ft 6 in (1.98 m)	215 lb (98 kg)	Sr	West Memphis	West Memphis, AR

Head coach

- Kelvin Sampson (UNC Pembroke)

Assistant coach(es)

Legend

- (C) Team captain
- (S) Suspended
- (I) Ineligible
- (W) Walk-on
- Injured
- Current redshirt

== Schedule ==
Date time, TV	Rank^{#}	Opponent^{#}	Result	Record	Site (attendance) city, state
Regular season
11/12/2001; 7:00 pm	No. 25	Central Connecticut	W 66–44	1–0	Lloyd Noble Center (8,140); Norman, OK
11/14/2001; 9:00 pm	No. 25	at No. 15 Michigan State	L 55–67	1–1	Breslin Center (14,759); East Lansing, MI
11/28/2001; 7:00 pm		Central Michigan	W 81–64	2–1	Lloyd Noble Center (8,836); Norman, OK
11/30/2001; 7:00 pm		at Arkansas	W 69–54	3–1	Bud Walton Arena (19,419); Fayetteville, AR
12/05/2001; 7:00 pm		St. Bonaventure	W 80–74	4–1	Lloyd Noble Center (9,057); Norman, OK
12/08/2001; 4:00 pm		Louisiana Tech	W 71–67	5–1	Lloyd Noble Center (9,684); Norman, OK
12/15/2001; 7:00 pm	No. 24	High Point	W 107–63	6–1	Lloyd Noble Center (9,431); Norman, OK
12/16/2001; 6:30 pm	No. 24	Bethune-Cookman	W 102–65	7–1	Lloyd Noble Center (8,839); Norman, OK
12/18/2001; 7:00 pm	No. 22	Eastern Illinois	W 109–50	8–1	Lloyd Noble Center (8,656); Norman, OK
12/21/2001; 7:00 pm	No. 22	No. 2 Maryland	W 72–56	9–1	Lloyd Noble Center (12,715); Norman, OK
12/29/2001; 8:00 pm	No. 12	vs. Texas Southern; All-College Basketball Classic	W 97–55	10–1	Myriad Convention Center (13,648); Oklahoma City, OK
01/05/2002; 7:00 pm, Sooner Sports Network	No. 10	Texas A&M	W 89–63	11–1 (1–0)	Lloyd Noble Center (10,351); Norman, OK
01/07/2002; 7:00 pm	No. 5	at Connecticut	W 69–67	12–1	Hartford Civic Center (16,294); Hartford, CT
01/12/2002; 12:45 pm, ESPN Plus	No. 5	Texas Tech	W 98–72	13–1 (2–0)	Lloyd Noble Center (12,654); Norman, OK
01/16/2002; 7:00 pm, Sooner Sports Network	No. 5	at Nebraska	W 92–77	14–1 (3–0)	Bob Devaney Sports Center (9,026); Lincoln, NE
01/19/2002; 12:00 pm, ABC	No. 5	at No. 4 Kansas	L 67–74	14–2 (3–1)	Allen Fieldhouse (16,300); Lawrence, KS
01/21/2002; 8:00 pm, ESPN	No. 5	No. 21 Missouri	W 84–71	15–2 (4–1)	Lloyd Noble Center (11,409); Norman, OK
01/26/2002; 12:00 pm, ABC	No. 6	at Texas Tech	L 79–92	15–3 (4–2)	United Spirit Arena (15,098); Lubbock, TX
01/30/2002; 8:00 pm, ESPN Plus	No. 6	No. 9 Oklahoma State; Bedlam Series	W 58–53	16–3 (5–2)	Lloyd Noble Center (12,145); Norman, OK
02/02/2002; 3:00 pm, ESPN Plus	No. 6	at Texas	W 85–84 ^{OT}	17–3 (6–2)	Frank Erwin Center (14,055); Austin, Texas
02/06/2002; 7:00 pm, Sooner Sports Network	No. 4	Baylor	W 70–57	18–3 (7–2)	Lloyd Noble Center (9,872); Norman, Oklahoma
02/09/2002; 12:45 pm, ESPN Plus	No. 4	at Texas A&M	W 68–64	19–3 (8–2)	Reed Arena (5,252); College Station, Texas
02/13/2002; 8:00 pm, ESPN Plus	No. 4	at No. 16 Oklahoma State; Bedlam Series	L 72–79 ^{OT}	19–4 (8–3)	Gallagher-Iba Arena (13,611); Stillwater, Oklahoma
02/16/2002; 12:45 pm, ESPN Plus	No. 4	Kansas State	W 73–62	20–4 (9–3)	Lloyd Noble Center (11,317); Norman, Oklahoma
02/19/2002; 7:00 pm, Sooner Sports Network	No. 6	at Baylor	W 65–54	21–4 (10–3)	Ferrell Center (6,643); Waco, Texas
02/23/2002; 8:00 pm, ESPN	No. 6	Texas	W 96–78	22–4 (11–3)	Lloyd Noble Center (12,724); Norman, Oklahoma
02/26/2002; 8:00 pm, ESPN Plus	No. 5	Iowa State	W 89–75	23–4 (12–3)	Lloyd Noble Center (10,828); Norman, OK
03/02/2002; 3:00 pm, ESPN Plus	No. 5	at Colorado	W 82–71	24–4 (13–3)	Coors Events Center (6,629); Boulder, Colorado
Big 12 tournament
03/08/2002; 6:00 pm, ESPN Plus	No. 4	Kansas State; Quarterfinals	W 63–52	25–4	Kemper Arena (18,848); Kansas City, Missouri
03/09/2002; 3:20 pm, ESPN, ESPN Plus	No. 4	vs. Texas; Semifinals	W 67–51	26–4	Kemper Arena (18,848); Kansas City, Missouri
03/10/2002; 2:00 pm, ESPN	No. 4	vs. No. 1 Kansas; Finals	W 64–55	27–4	Kemper Arena (18,848); Kansas City, MO
NCAA tournament
03/15/2002; 12:30 pm, CBS	(W2) No. 3	vs. (W15) Illinois-Chicago; First Round	W 71–63	28–4	American Airlines Center (19,200); Dallas, Texas
03/17/2002; 4:30 pm, CBS	(W2) No. 3	vs. (W7) Xavier; Second Round	W 75–68	29–4	American Airlines Center (19,951); Dallas, Texas
03/21/2002; 7:55 pm, CBS	(W2) No. 3	vs. (W3) Arizona; Sweet Sixteen	W 88–67	30–4	Compaq Center (18,040); San Jose, California
03/23/2002; 3:40 pm, CBS	(W2) No. 3	vs. (W12) Missouri; Elite Eight	W 81–75	31–4	Compaq Center (18,040); San Jose, California
04/01/2002; 5:00 pm, CBS	(W2) No. 3	vs. (S5) Indiana; Final Four	L 64–73	31–5	Georgia Dome (53,378); Atlanta, Georgia
*Non-conference game. ^{#}Rankings from AP Poll. (#) Tournament seedings in parentheses. All times are in Central Time. (#) during NCAA Tournament is seed within region W=West.

== NCAA basketball tournament ==
Seeding in brackets

- West
  - Oklahoma (2) 71, Illinois Chicago (15) 63
  - Oklahoma 78, Xavier, Ohio (7) 65
  - Oklahoma 88, Arizona (3) 67
  - Oklahoma 81, Missouri (12) 75
- Final Four
  - Indiana 73, Oklahoma 64
