= 2001–02 Iowa State Cyclones men's basketball team =

American college basketball season

2001–02 Iowa State Cyclones men's basketball
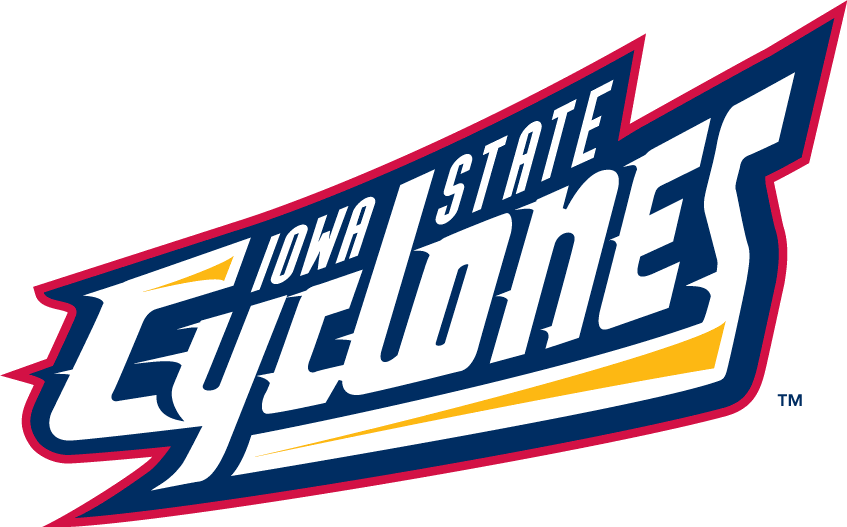
- Conference: Big 12 Conference
- Record: 12-19 (4-12 Big 12)
- Head coach: Larry Eustachy (4th season)
- Assistant coaches: Randy Brown; Bob Sundvold; Lance Irvin
- Home arena: Hilton Coliseum

2001–02 Big 12 men's basketball standings
	Conf.				Overall
Team	W		L	PCT	W		L	PCT
No. 2 Kansas	16	–	0	1.000	33	–	4	.892
No. 3 Oklahoma †	13	–	3	.813	31	–	5	.861
Texas	10	–	6	.625	22	–	12	.647
No. 20 Oklahoma State	10	–	6	.625	23	–	9	.719
Texas Tech	10	–	6	.625	23	–	9	.719
Missouri	9	–	7	.563	24	–	12	.667
Kansas State	6	–	10	.375	13	–	16	.448
Nebraska	6	–	10	.375	13	–	15	.464
Colorado	5	–	11	.313	15	–	14	.517
Baylor	4	–	12	.250	14	–	16	.467
Iowa State	4	–	12	.250	12	–	19	.387
Texas A&M	3	–	13	.188	9	–	22	.290
† 2002 Big 12 Tournament winner Rankings from AP poll

The 2001–02 Iowa State Cyclones men's basketball team represented Iowa State University during the 2001–02 NCAA Division I men's basketball season. The Cyclones were coached by Larry Eustachy, who was in his 4th season. They played their home games at Hilton Coliseum in Ames, Iowa and competed in the Big 12 Conference.

== Previous season ==
They finished the season 25–6, 13–3 in Big 12 play to finish in first place. They lost to Baylor in the quarterfinals of the Big 12 Conference tournament. They received an at-large bid to the NCAA tournament, where they were upset by Hampton.

== Incoming players ==
Incoming players
Name	Position	Height	Weight	Previous school	Hometown
Ricky Morgan	Guard	5'11"	185 lbs.	Pontiac Northern	Pontiac, Michigan
Adam Schaper	Forward	6'9"	215 lbs.	Kankakee Valley	DeMotte, Indiana
Jared Homan	Center	6'9"	230 lbs.	St. Mary's	Remsen, Iowa
Tommie King	Forward	6'6"	225 lbs.	Western Nebraska CC	Seattle, WA

== Roster ==
2001–02 Iowa State Cyclones men's basketball team
Players
Coaches

Pos.	#	Name	Height	Weight	Year	Previous school	Hometown
G	0	Jake Sullivan (C)	6 ft 1 in (1.85 m)	195 lb (88 kg)	So	Tartan High	Oakdale, Minnesota
F	1	Omar Bynum	6 ft 7 in (2.01 m)	210 lb (95 kg)	Jr	Omaha North	Omaha, Nebraska
F	2	Tommie King	6 ft 6 in (1.98 m)	225 lb (102 kg)	Jr	Western Nebraska CC	Seattle, WA
G	3	Brandon Nicol	6 ft 3 in (1.91 m)	170 lb (77 kg)	Jr	Graettinger High	Graettinger, Iowa
G	10	Brian Gahan	6 ft 4 in (1.93 m)	205 lb (93 kg)	So	McKinney High	McKinney, Texas
G	11	Ricky Morgan	5 ft 11 in (1.8 m)	185 lb (84 kg)	Fr	Pontiac Northern	Pontiac, Michigan
F	15	Adam Schaper	6 ft 9 in (2.06 m)	215 lb (98 kg)	Fr	Kankakee Valley	DeMotte, Indiana
F	21	Shane Power (C)	6 ft 5 in (1.96 m)	210 lb (95 kg)	So	Merrillville Andrean	Crown Point, Indiana
F	33	Clint Varley	6 ft 4 in (1.93 m)	225 lb (102 kg)	Jr	Greenfield High	Menlo, Iowa
F	34	Tyray Pearson (C)	6 ft 7 in (2.01 m)	225 lb (102 kg)	Sr	Hammond High	Hammond, Indiana
G	40	Brad Davis	6 ft 2 in (1.88 m)	215 lb (98 kg)	Jr	Knoxville High	Knoxville, Iowa
G	42	Justin Fries	6 ft 2 in (1.88 m)	200 lb (91 kg)	Jr	Washington High	Sioux Falls, South Dakota
G/F	50	Marcus Jefferson	6 ft 5 in (1.96 m)	205 lb (93 kg)	RS So	Notre Dame Prep	East Chicago
C	51	Jared Homan	6 ft 9 in (2.06 m)	230 lb (104 kg)	Fr	St. Mary's	Remsen, Iowa
C	54	Andrew Skoglund	7 ft 1 in (2.16 m)	250 lb (113 kg)	So	Hopkins High	Minnetonka, Minnesota

Head coach

- Larry Eustachy (Long Beach State)

Assistant coach(es)

- Randy Brown (Arizona)

Legend

- (C) Team captain
- (S) Suspended
- (I) Ineligible
- (W) Walk-on
- Injured
- Current redshirt

== Schedule and results ==
Date time, TV	Rank^{#}	Opponent^{#}	Result	Record	Site city, state
Exhibition
November 6, 2001*; 7:00 pm		Global Sports; Exhibition	W 90-81		Hilton Coliseum; Ames, Iowa
November 12, 2001*; 7:00 pm		Next Level Sports; Exhibition	W 86-62		Hilton Coliseum; Ames, Iowa
Regular season
November 19, 2001*; 7:00 pm		Hartford	W 83-54	1-0	Hilton Coliseum; Ames, Iowa
November 22, 2001*; 4:30 pm		vs. Southern Illinois; Las Vegas Invitational	L 57-66	1-1	Orleans Arena; Las Vegas, Nevada
November 23, 2001*; 4:30 pm		vs. St. Louis; Las Vegas Invitational	W 77-72	2-1	Orleans Arena; Las Vegas, Nevada
November 24, 2001*; 7:00 pm		vs. Pennsylvania; Las Vegas Invitational Second Place Matchup	L 77-84	2-2	Orleans Arena; Las Vegas, Nevada
November 27, 2001*; 7:00 pm		Savannah State	W 64-39	3-2	Hilton Coliseum; Ames, Iowa
November 30, 2001*; 8:00 pm, Cyclone Television Network		University of Wisconsin–Milwaukee; The Tribune Cyclone Challenge	W 71-62	4-2	Hilton Coliseum; Ames, Iowa
December 1, 2001*; 8:00 pm, Cyclone Television Network		San Jose State; The Tribune Cyclone Challenge	L 62-64	4-3	Hilton Coliseum; Ames, Iowa
December 4, 2001*; 7:00 pm, Cyclone Television Network		Arkansas–Pine Bluff	W 66-43	5-3	Hilton Coliseum; Ames, Iowa
December 8, 2001*; 7:05 pm, Cyclone Television Network		No. 12 Iowa	L 53-78	5-4	Hilton Coliseum; Ames, Iowa
December 11, 2001*; 6:00 pm, ESPN		at No. 11 Boston College	L 81-86	5-5	Conte Forum; Chestnut Hill, Massachusetts
December 15, 2001*; 7:00 pm, DTV		at Drake	L 58-72	5-6	Knapp Center; Des Moines, Iowa
December 23, 2001*; 1:00 pm, Cyclone Television Network		Maryland Eastern Shore	W 77-54	6-6	Hilton Coliseum; Ames, Iowa
December 29, 2001*; 1:00 pm, Cyclone Television Network		Northern Iowa	W 88-69	7-6	Hilton Coliseum; Ames, Iowa
December 31, 2001*; 6:00 pm, Cyclone Television Network		Morris Brown	W 69-45	8-6	Hilton Coliseum; Ames, Iowa
January 5, 2002; 5:00 pm, Cyclone Television Network		at Baylor	L 74-79	8-7 (0-1)	Ferrell Center; Waco, Texas
January 9, 2002; 7:00 pm, Cyclone Television Network		No. 17 Missouri	W 71-67	9-7 (1-1)	Hilton Coliseum; Ames, Iowa
January 12, 2002; 4:00 pm, ESPN		at No. 6 Oklahoma State	L 66-69	9-8 (1-2)	Gallagher-Iba Arena; Stillwater, Oklahoma
January 16, 2002; 8:00 pm, Cyclone Television Network		at Colorado	L 61-63	9-9 (1-3)	Coors Events Center; Boulder, Colorado
January 19, 2002; 7:00 pm, Cyclone Television Network		at Kansas State	L 52-63	9-10 (1-4)	Bramlage Coliseum; Manhattan, Kansas
January 23, 2002; 8:00 pm, ESPN Plus		No. 2 Kansas	L 81-88	9-11 (1-5)	Hilton Coliseum; Ames, Iowa
January 26, 2002; 8:00 pm, ESPN Plus		at Nebraska	L 84-86 ^{OT}	9-12 (1-6)	Bob Devaney Sports Center; Lincoln, Nebraska
January 29, 2002; 7:00 pm, Cyclone Television Network		Texas A&M	L 50-52	9-13 (1-7)	Hilton Coliseum; Ames, Iowa
February 2, 2002; 12:45 pm, ESPN Plus		at No. 20 Texas Tech	L 43-69	9-14 (1-8)	Reed Arena; Lubbock, Texas
February 6, 2002; 7:00 pm, Cyclone Television Network		at No. 22 Missouri	L 73-76	9-15 (1-9)	Hearnes Center; Columbia, Missouri
February 13, 2002; 8:00 pm, ESPN Plus		Colorado	W 89-63	10-15 (2-9)	Hilton Coliseum; Ames, Iowa
February 16, 2002; 12:30 pm, ESPN Plus		Nebraska	W 85-79	11-15 (3-9)	Hilton Coliseum; Ames, Iowa
February 18, 2002; 8:00 pm, ESPN		at No. 1 Kansas; Big Monday	L 66-102	11-16 (3-10)	Allen Fieldhouse; Lawrence, Kansas
February 23, 2002; 12:45 pm, ESPN Plus		Kansas State	W 73-71	12-16 (4-10)	Hilton Coliseum; Ames, Iowa
February 26, 2002; 8:00 pm, ESPN Plus		at No. 5 Oklahoma	L 75-89	12-17 (4-11)	Lloyd Noble Center; Norman, Oklahoma
March 2, 2002; 8:00 pm, ESPN		Texas	L 76-79	12-18 (4-12)	Hilton Coliseum; Ames, Iowa
Big 12 Tournament
March 7, 2002; 8:35 pm, ESPN2		vs. Missouri	L 59-79	12-19 (4-12)	Kemper Arena; Kansas City, Missouri
*Non-conference game. ^{#}Rankings from AP poll. (#) Tournament seedings in parentheses. All times are in Central Time.

== Awards and honors ==
- All-Conference Selections

Tyrary Pearson (2nd Team)
Jake Sullivan (3rd Team)
Shane Power (Honorable Mention)

- Academic All-Big 12 first team

Jake Sullivan (2002)

- Ralph A. Olsen Award

Tyray Pearson (2002)
