= 2001–02 Missouri Tigers men's basketball team =

American college basketball season

2001–02 Missouri Tigers men's basketball

Guardians Classic champions

NCAA tournament, Elite Eight
- Conference: Big 12 Conference

Ranking
- Coaches: No. 15
- Record: 24–12 (9–7 Big 12)
- Head coach: Quin Snyder (3rd season)
- Assistant coaches: Tony Harvey (3rd season); Lane Odom (2nd season); Marcus Perez (2nd season)
- Home arena: Hearnes Center

2001–02 Big 12 men's basketball standings
	Conf.				Overall
Team	W		L	PCT	W		L	PCT
No. 2 Kansas	16	–	0	1.000	33	–	4	.892
No. 3 Oklahoma †	13	–	3	.813	31	–	5	.861
Texas	10	–	6	.625	22	–	12	.647
No. 20 Oklahoma State	10	–	6	.625	23	–	9	.719
Texas Tech	10	–	6	.625	23	–	9	.719
Missouri	9	–	7	.563	24	–	12	.667
Kansas State	6	–	10	.375	13	–	16	.448
Nebraska	6	–	10	.375	13	–	15	.464
Colorado	5	–	11	.313	15	–	14	.517
Baylor	4	–	12	.250	14	–	16	.467
Iowa State	4	–	12	.250	12	–	19	.387
Texas A&M	3	–	13	.188	9	–	22	.290
† 2002 Big 12 Tournament winner Rankings from AP poll

The 2001–02 Missouri Tigers men's basketball team represented the University of Missouri as a member of the Big 12 Conference during the 2001–02 NCAA men's basketball season. Led by third-year head coach Quin Snyder, the Tigers reached the Elite Eight of the NCAA tournament, and finished with an overall record of 24–12 (9–7 Big 12).

== Roster ==
2001–02 Missouri Tigers men's basketball team
Players
Coaches

Pos.	#	Name	Height	Weight	Year	Hometown
C	00	Uche Okafor	6 ft 11 in (2.11 m)	245 lb (111 kg)	Jr	Anambra State, Nigeria
G	2	Wesley Stokes	5 ft 10 in (1.78 m)	175 lb (79 kg)	So	Long Beach, California
G	4	Clarence Gilbert (C)	6 ft 2 in (1.88 m)	194 lb (88 kg)	Sr	Ft. Lauderdale, Florida
F	5	Travon Bryant	6 ft 9 in (2.06 m)	245 lb (111 kg)	So	Long Beach, California
G	10	Ryan Kiernan	6 ft 0 in (1.83 m)	195 lb (88 kg)	Jr	St. Charles, Missouri
G	11	Duane John	6 ft 6 in (1.98 m)	190 lb (86 kg)	Fr	Toronto, Ontario
F	12	Justin Gage	6 ft 4 in (1.93 m)	208 lb (94 kg)	Jr	Jefferson City, Missouri
F	15	Josh Kroenke	6 ft 4 in (1.93 m)	200 lb (91 kg)	So	Columbia, Missouri
F	21	Kareem Rush (C)	6 ft 6 in (1.98 m)	218 lb (99 kg)	Jr	Kansas City, Missouri
G	23	Rickey Paulding	6 ft 5 in (1.96 m)	210 lb (95 kg)	So	Detroit, Michigan
G	24	Jake Jackson	6 ft 2 in (1.88 m)	191 lb (87 kg)	Jr	DeSoto, Missouri
F/C	32	Jeffrey Ferguson	6 ft 10 in (2.08 m)	230 lb (104 kg)	Fr	Toronto, Ontario
G/F	33	Najeeb Echols	6 ft 7 in (2.01 m)	235 lb (107 kg)	Fr	Chicago, Illinois
G	35	Michael Griffin	6 ft 3 in (1.91 m)	180 lb (82 kg)	So	Norcross, Georgia
F	50	Arthur Johnson	6 ft 9 in (2.06 m)	270 lb (122 kg)	So	Detroit, Michigan

Head coach

- Quin Snyder (Duke)

Assistant coach(es)

- Tony Harvey (Cameron)
- Lane Odom (High Point)
- Marcus Perez (Army)

Legend

- (C) Team captain
- (S) Suspended
- (I) Ineligible
- (W) Walk-on
- Injured
- Current redshirt

Roster

== Schedule and results ==
Date time, TV	Rank^{#}	Opponent^{#}	Result	Record	High points	High rebounds	High assists	Site (attendance) city, state
Regular season
Nov 13, 2001*; 8:00 pm	No. 8	Tennessee–Martin; Guardians Classic – Campus Game	W 89–63	1–0	28 – Rush	10 – Johnson	7 – Stokes	Hearnes Center (10,387); Columbia, MO
Nov 14, 2001*; 8:00 pm	No. 8	Air Force; Guardians Classic – Campus Game	W 86–58	2–0	20 – Gilbert	5 – Tied	2 – Tied	Hearnes Center (8,915); Columbia, MO
Nov 20, 2001*; 9:00 pm	No. 5	vs. No. 22 Alabama; Guardians Classic – Semifinals	W 75–68	3–0	18 – Gilbert	12 – Stokes	4 – Stokes	Kemper Arena (11,696); Kansas City, MO
Nov 21, 2001*; 9:00 pm	No. 5	vs. No. 9 Iowa; Guardians Classic – Championship Game	W 78–77	4–0	27 – Gilbert	6 – Rush	3 – Rush	Kemper Arena (12,136); Kansas City, MO
Nov 24, 2001*; 8:30 pm	No. 5	vs. Xavier; John R. Wooden Classic	W 72–60	5–0	24 – Rush	12 – Rush	6 – Gilbert	Conseco Fieldhouse (12,867); Indianapolis, IN
Nov 29, 2001*; 7:00 pm	No. 3	Jackson State	W 106–68	6–0	24 – Rush	10 – Johnson	7 – Stokes	Hearnes Center (11,289); Columbia, MO
Dec 1, 2001*; 3:00 pm	No. 3	Grambling State	W 100–76	7–0	20 – Gilbert	10 – Johnson	7 – Tied	Hearnes Center (12,389); Columbia, MO
Dec 3, 2001*; 6:00 pm	No. 2	at St. Louis	W 69–67	8–0	18 – Tied	16 – Johnson	5 – Stokes	Savvis Center (20,602); St. Louis, MO
Dec 6, 2001*; 7:00 pm	No. 2	Southern	W 117–67	9–0	29 – Gilbert	8 – Tied	11 – Stokes	Hearnes Center (10,846); Columbia, MO
Dec 15, 2001*; 8:00 pm	No. 2	No. 15 Iowa; Fire Code Game	L 65–83	9–1	22 – Paulding	6 – Paulding	2 – Tied	Hearnes Center (13,545); Columbia, MO
Dec 22, 2001*; 8:00 pm	No. 8	vs. No. 9 Illinois; Braggin' Rights	L 61–72	9–2	16 – Rush	9 – Johnson	7 – Stokes	Savvis Center (22,153); St. Louis, MO
Dec 29, 2001*; 1:00 pm	No. 10	at DePaul	L 62–63	9–3	20 – Johnson	18 – Johnson	4 – Stokes	United Center (6,234); Chicago, IL
Jan 2, 2002*; 7:00 pm	No. 17	Coppin State	W 74–47	10–3	23 – Rush	8 – Johnson	11 – Stokes	Hearnes Center (10,416); Columbia, MO
Jan 5, 2002; 12:45 pm	No. 17	Nebraska	W 60–53	11–3 (1–0)	17 – Gilbert	7 – Tied	5 – Rush	Hearnes Center (13,545); Columbia, MO
Jan 9, 2002; 7:00 pm	No. 17	at Iowa State	L 67–71	11–4 (1–1)	29 – Rush	10 – Johnson	2 – Tied	Hilton Coliseum (9,850); Ames, IA
Jan 12, 2002; 3:00 pm	No. 17	at Kansas State	W 81–66	12–4 (2–1)	23 – Johnson	15 – Johnson	6 – Stokes	Bramlage Coliseum (7,112); Manhattan, KS
Jan 16, 2002; 7:00 pm	No. 21	at Texas A&M	W 74–50	13–4 (3–1)	18 – Rush	11 – Johnson	4 – Gilbert	Reed Arena (12,184); College Station, TX
Jan 19, 2002; 12:45 pm	No. 21	Colorado	W 92–77	14–4 (4–1)	29 – Rush	8 – Bryant	6 – Gilbert	Hearnes Center (11,886); Columbia, MO
Jan 21, 2002; 8:00 pm	No. 18	at No. 5 Oklahoma	L 71–84	14–5 (4–2)	26 – Gilbert	5 – Bryant	5 – Stokes	Lloyd Noble Center (11,409); Norman, OK
Jan 26, 2002; 12:45 pm	No. 18	Kansas State	W 86–74	15–5 (5–2)	22 – Paulding	6 – Tied	4 – Stokes	Hearnes Center (13,168); Columbia, MO
Jan 28, 2002; 8:00 pm	No. 22	at No. 2 Kansas	L 73–105	15–6 (5–3)	19 – Tied	7 – Rush	4 – Rush	Allen Fieldhouse (16,300); Lawrence, KS
Feb 3, 2002*; 1:00 pm	No. 22	No. 8 Virginia	W 81–77	16–6	26 – Rush	8 – Johnson	4 – Tied	Hearnes Center (12,136); Columbia, MO
Feb 6, 2002; 7:00 pm	No. 22	Iowa State	W 76–73	17–6 (6–3)	27 – Gilbert	10 – Johnson	8 – Gilbert	Hearnes Center (12,480); Columbia, MO
Feb 9, 2002; 8:00 pm	No. 22	at Baylor	L 80–81	17–7 (6–4)	29 – Rush	11 – Johnson	6 – Gilbert	Ferrell Center (8,121); Waco, TX
Feb 13, 2002; 7:05 pm		at Nebraska	W 87–71	18–7 (7–4)	30 – Rush	8 – Bryant	8 – Stokes	Devaney Center (9,622); Lincoln, NE
Feb 17, 2002; 2:30 pm		Texas	L 70–72	18–8 (7–5)	16 – Tied	9 – Johnson	6 – Gilbert	Hearnes Center (13,545); Columbia, MO
Feb 20, 2002; 8:15 pm		at Texas Tech	L 68–91	18–9 (7–6)	22 – Rush	10 – Tied	5 – Gilbert	United Spirit Arena (14,426); Lubbock, TX
Feb 23, 2002; 2:00 pm		at Colorado	W 96–63	19–9 (8–6)	40 – Gilbert	6 – Johnson	7 – Stokes	Coors Events Center (6,827); Boulder, CO
Feb 25, 2002; 8:00 pm		No. 13 Oklahoma State	W 72–69	20–9 (9–6)	21 – Paulding	14 – Johnson	3 – Tied	Hearnes Center (12,374); Columbia, MO
Mar 3, 2002; 1:00 pm		No. 1 Kansas	L 92–95	20–10 (9–7)	27 – Gilbert	8 – Tied	7 – Rush	Hearnes Center (13,545); Columbia, MO
Big 12 Tournament
Mar 7, 2002*; 8:45 pm	(6)	vs. (11) Iowa State; Quarterfinals	W 79–59	21–10	26 – Gilbert	9 – Gage	4 – Paulding	Kemper Arena (18,848); Kansas City, MO
Mar 8, 2002*; 8:35 pm	(6)	vs. (3) Texas; Semifinals	L 85–89	21–11	33 – Rush	9 – Bryant	5 – Gilbert	Kemper Arena (18,848); Kansas City, MO
NCAA Tournament
Mar 14, 2002*; 10:40 am, CBS	(12 W)	vs. (5 W) No. 21 Miami (FL); First Round	W 93–80	22–11	20 – Gilbert	11 – Bryant	7 – Rush	University Arena; Albuquerque, NM
Mar 16, 2002*; 1:20 pm, CBS	(12 W)	vs. (4 W) No. 14 Ohio State; Second Round	W 83–67	23–11	20 – Paulding	9 – Tied	6 – Gilbert	University Arena; Albuquerque, NM
Mar 21, 2002*; 7:15 pm, CBS	(12 W)	vs. (8 W) UCLA; Sweet Sixteen	W 82–73	24–11	23 – Gilbert	14 – Johnson	4 – Rush	Compaq Center (18,040); San Jose, CA
Mar 23, 2002*; 1:40 pm, CBS	(12 W)	vs. (2 W) No. 3 Oklahoma; Elite Eight	L 75–81	24–12	22 – Paulding	9 – Bryant	5 – Tied	Compaq Center (18,040); San Jose, CA
*Non-conference game. ^{#}Rankings from AP. (#) Tournament seedings in parentheses. All times are in Central Time. W = West.
