= 2001–02 Kansas Jayhawks men's basketball team =

American college basketball season

2001–02 Kansas Jayhawks men's basketball

Big 12 regular season champions

NCAA tournament, Final Four
- Conference: Big 12 Conference
- North

Ranking
- Coaches: No. 2
- AP: No. 2
- Record: 33–4 (16–0 Big 12)
- Head coach: Roy Williams (14th season)
- Assistant coaches: Neil Dougherty (7th season); Jerod Haase (3rd season); Joe Holladay (8th season); Ben Miller (2nd season)
- Captains: Jeff Boschee; Jeff Carey
- Home arena: Allen Fieldhouse

2001–02 Big 12 men's basketball standings
	Conf.				Overall
Team	W		L	PCT	W		L	PCT
No. 2 Kansas	16	–	0	1.000	33	–	4	.892
No. 3 Oklahoma †	13	–	3	.813	31	–	5	.861
Texas	10	–	6	.625	22	–	12	.647
No. 20 Oklahoma State	10	–	6	.625	23	–	9	.719
Texas Tech	10	–	6	.625	23	–	9	.719
Missouri	9	–	7	.563	24	–	12	.667
Kansas State	6	–	10	.375	13	–	16	.448
Nebraska	6	–	10	.375	13	–	15	.464
Colorado	5	–	11	.313	15	–	14	.517
Baylor	4	–	12	.250	14	–	16	.467
Iowa State	4	–	12	.250	12	–	19	.387
Texas A&M	3	–	13	.188	9	–	22	.290
† 2002 Big 12 Tournament winner Rankings from AP poll

The 2001–02 Kansas Jayhawks men's basketball team represented the University of Kansas in the 2001–02 NCAA Division I men's basketball season, which was the Jayhawks' 104th basketball season. The head coach was Roy Williams, who served his 14th year at KU. The team played its home games in Allen Fieldhouse in Lawrence, Kansas.

== Roster ==
Name	#	Position	Height	Weight	Year	Home Town
Brett Ballard	3	Guard	6–0	175	Senior	Hutchinson, Kansas
Jeff Boschee	13	Guard	6–1	185	Senior	Valley City, North Dakota
Jeff Carey	22	Center	6–11	250	Senior	Camdenton, Missouri
Nick Collison	4	Forward	6–9	255	Junior	Iowa Falls, Iowa
Drew Gooden	0	Forward	6–10	230	Junior	Richmond, California
Lewis Harrison	2	Guard	6–0	165	Senior	Kansas City, Kansas
Jeff Hawkins	1	Guard	5–11	175	Freshman (RS)	Kansas City, Kansas
Kirk Hinrich	10	Guard	6–3	190	Junior	Sioux City, Iowa
Todd Kappelmann	50	Forward	6–9	230	Senior	Augusta, Kansas
Keith Langford	5	Guard	6–4	205	Freshman	Fort Worth, Texas
Michael Lee	25	Guard	6–3	215	Freshman	Portland, Oregon
Aaron Miles	11	Guard	6–1	175	Freshman	Portland, Oregon
Bryant Nash	15	Forward	6–6	205	Sophomore	Carrollton, Texas
Wayne Simien	23	Forward	6–9	255	Freshman	Leavenworth, Kansas
Chris Zerbe	34	Forward	6–5	235	Senior	Andover, Kansas

== Schedule ==
Date time, TV	Rank^{#}	Opponent^{#}	Result	Record	Site (attendance) city, state
Exhibition
11/7/2001*	No. 4	EA Sports All-Stars	W 98–77		Allen Fieldhouse (15,500); Lawrence, KS
11/13/2001*	No. 4	Fort Hays State	W 95–41		Allen Fieldhouse (15,300); Lawrence, KS
Maui Invitational Tournament
11/19/2001*; 3:30PM, Jayhawk-TV	No. 4	vs. Ball State	L 91–93	0–1	Lahaina Civic Center (2,500); Maui, HI
11/20/2001*; 3:00PM, Jayhawk-TV	No. 4	vs. Houston	W 95–78	1–1	Lahaina Civic Center (2,500); Maui, HI
11/21/2001*; 2:30PM, ESPN	No. 4	vs. Seton Hall	W 80–62	2–1	Lahaina Civic Center (2,500); Maui, HI
Regular season
11/28/2001*; 7:00PM, Jayhawk-TV	No. 8	Pittsburg State	W 105–62	3–1	Allen Fieldhouse (16,100); Lawrence, KS
12/1/2001*; 1:30PM, CBS	No. 8	at No. 4 Arizona	W 105–97	4–1	McKale Center (14,562); Tucson, AZ
12/4/2001*; 8:00PM, ESPN	No. 4	No. 23 Wake Forest	W 83–76	5–1	Allen Fieldhouse (16,300); Lawrence, KS
12/8/2001*; 7:00PM, Jayhawk-TV	No. 4	UMKC	W 79–68	6–1	Allen Fieldhouse (16,300); Lawrence, KS
12/12/2001*; 7:00PM, ESPN2	No. 4	at Princeton	W 78–62	7–1	Jadwin Gymnasium (6,861); Princeton, NJ
12/15/2001*; 7:00PM, Jayhawk-TV	No. 4	South Carolina State	W 106–73	8–1	Allen Fieldhouse (16,300); Lawrence, KS
12/22/2001*; 1:00PM, Jayhawk-TV	No. 3	at North Dakota	W 108–77	9–1	Ralph Engelstad Arena (13,280); Grand Forks, ND
12/29/2001*; 8:00PM, Jayhawk-TV	No. 2	Tulsa; Morse Chevrolet Shootout	W 93–85	10–1	Kemper Arena (16,013); Kansas City, MO
1/2/2002*; 7:00PM, Jayhawk-TV	No. 2	Valparaiso	W 81–73	11–1	Allen Fieldhouse (16,300); Lawrence, KS
1/5/2002; 8:00PM, Big 12 (ESPN+)	No. 2	at Colorado	W 97–85	12–1	Coors Events Center (11,076); Bouler, CO
1/9/2002; 7:00PM, Big 12 (ESPN+)	No. 1	Nebraska	W 96–57	13–1	Allen Fieldhouse (16,300); Lawrence, KS
1/12/2002*; 2:00PM, CBS	No. 1	at No. 11 UCLA	L 77–87	13–2	Pauley Pavilion (12,280); Los Angeles, CA
1/15/2002; 8:00PM, Big 12 (ESPN+)	No. 4	at No. 6 Oklahoma State	W 79–61	14–2	Gallagher-Iba Arena (13,611); Stillwater, OK
1/19/2002; 12:00PM, ABC	No. 4	No. 5 Oklahoma	W 74–67	15–2	Allen Fieldhouse (16,300); Lawrence, KS
1/23/2002; 8:00PM, Big 12 (ESPN+)	No. 2	at Iowa State	W 88–81	16–2	James H. Hilton Coliseum (12,771); Ames, IA
1/26/2002; 3:00PM, Big 12 (ESPN+)	No. 2	at Texas A&M	W 86–74	17–2	Reed Arena (10,706); College Station, TX
1/28/2002; 8:00PM, ESPN	No. 2	No. 22 Missouri; Border War	W 105–73	18–2	Allen Fieldhouse (16,300); Lawrence, KS
2/2/2002; 3:00PM, Big 12 (ESPN+)	No. 2	Colorado	W 100–73	19–2	Allen Fieldhouse (16,300); Lawrence, KS
2/4/2002; 8:00PM, ESPN2	No. 2	at Kansas State; Sunflower Showdown	W 98–71	20–2	Bramlage Coliseum (12,238); Manhattan, KS
2/9/2002; 3:00PM, Big 12 (ESPN+)	No. 2	No. 24 Texas Tech	W 108–81	21–2	Allen Fieldhouse (16,300); Lawrence, KS
2/11/2002; 8:00PM, ESPN	No. 2	at Texas	W 110–103 OT	22–2	Frank Erwin Center (15,495); Austin, TX
2/16/2002; 3:00PM, Big 12 (ESPN+)	No. 2	Baylor	W 87–72	23–2	Allen Fieldhouse (16,300); Lawrence, KS
2/18/2002; 8:00PM, ESPN	No. 1	Iowa State	W 102–66	24–2	Allen Fieldhouse (16,300); Lawrence, KS
2/24/2002; 3:00PM, CBS	No. 1	at Nebraska	W 88–87	25–2	Bob Devaney Sports Center (14,055); Lincoln, NE
2/27/2002; 7:00PM, Big 12 (ESPN+)	No. 1	Kansas State; Sunflower Showdown	W 103–68	26–2	Allen Fieldhouse (16,300); Lawrence, KS
3/3/2002; 1:00PM, CBS	No. 1	at Missouri; Border War	W 95–92	27–2	Hearnes Center (13,545); Columbia, MO
Big 12 tournament
3/8/2002; 12:00PM, Big 12 (ESPN+)	No. 1	vs. Colorado; Quarterfinals	W 102–73	28–2	Kemper Arena (18,848); Kansas City, MO
3/9/2002; 1:00PM, Big 12 (ESPN+)	No. 1	vs. Texas Tech; Semifinals	W 90–50	29–2	Kemper Arena (18,848); Kansas City, MO
3/10/2002; 2:00PM, ESPN	No. 1	vs. No. 4 Oklahoma; Championship Game	L 55–64	29–3	Kemper Arena (18,848); Kansas City, MO
NCAA tournament
3/14/2002*; 6:50PM, CBS	No. 2 (1)	vs. (16) Holy Cross; First Round	W 70–59	30–3	Edward Jones Dome (26,612); St. Louis, MO
3/16/2002*; 6:50PM, CBS	No. 2 (1)	No. 24 (8) Stanford; Second Round	W 86–63	31–3	Edward Jones Dome (31,484); St. Louis, MO
3/22/2002*; 1:40PM, CBS	No. 2 (1)	vs. No. 13 (4) Illinois; Sweet Sixteen	W 73–69	32–3	Kohl Center (16,310); Madison, WI
3/24/2002*; 1:40PM, CBS	No. 2 (1)	vs. No. 11 (2) Oregon; Elite Eight	W 104–86	33–3	Kohl Center (16,310); Madison, WI
3/30/2002*; 7:47PM, CBS	No. 2 (1)	vs. No. 4 (1) Maryland; Final Four	L 88–97	33–4	Georgia Dome (53,378); Atlanta, GA
*Non-conference game. ^{#}Rankings from AP Poll, NCAA tournament seeds shown in parentheses. (#) Tournament seedings in parentheses. All times are in Central Standard Time.

== Rankings ==
Poll	Pre	Wk 1	Wk 2	Wk 3	Wk 4	Wk 5	Wk 6	Wk 7	Wk 8	Wk 9	Wk 10	Wk 11	Wk 12	Wk 13	Wk 14	Wk 15	Wk 16	Wk 17	Wk 18
AP	7	4	8	4	4	3	2	2	1	4	2	2	2	2	1	1	1	2	–
Coaches	7	5	3	7	5	5	4	3	3	3	4	2	2	2	1	1	1	2	2

== See also ==
- 2002 NCAA Division I men's basketball tournament
- 2002 Big 12 men's basketball tournament
- 2001-02 NCAA Division I men's basketball season
- 2001–02 NCAA Division I men's basketball rankings
