= Texas Longhorns men's basketball, 2000–2009 =

== 1999–2000 season ==
=== Schedule and results ===
NCAA Second Round; Coach: Rick Barnes; Overall record: 24–9; Big 12 record: 13–3; Big 12 standing: 2nd Final AP Poll: 15th Final ESPN/USA Today Coaches' Poll: 21st
Date	Time	Opponent^{#}	Rank^{#}	Site	TV	Result	Attendance	Record
Regular season
Sat, Nov 20	7 P.M.	Louisiana-Lafayette	#21	Frank Erwin Center • Austin, Texas (Black Coaches Association Freedom Classic)	UT Syndicated TV	W 82–48	7,521	1–0
Thu, Nov 25	3:30 P.M.	vs. Arizona State	#20	Eugenio Guerra Arena • Bayamón, Puerto Rico (Puerto Rico Shootout)	UT Syndicated TV	W 88–71	250	2–0
Fri, Nov 26	3 P.M.	vs. #18 DePaul	#20	Eugenio Guerra Arena • Bayamón, Puerto Rico (Puerto Rico Shootout)		W 68–64	250	3–0
Sat, Nov 27	6 P.M.	vs. #3 Michigan State	#20	Eugenio Guerra Arena • Bayamón, Puerto Rico (Puerto Rico Shootout)	ESPN2	W 81–74	350	4–0
Sat, Dec 4	8 P.M.	#4 Arizona	#9	Frank Erwin Center • Austin, Texas	ESPN	L 81–88	15,226	4–1
Tue, Dec 7	7 P.M.	@ Wisconsin	#10	Kohl Center • Madison, Wisconsin	UT Syndicated TV	L 45–61	14,712	4–2
Sat, Dec 11	TBA	San Diego	#10	Frank Erwin Center • Austin, Texas		W 76–66	7,915	5–2
Sat, Dec 18	1 P.M.	Wofford	#15	Frank Erwin Center • Austin, Texas	UT Syndicated TV	W 89–57	6,539	6–2
Wed, Dec 22	11 A.M.	@ Utah	#14	Jon M. Huntsman Center • Salt Lake City, Utah	ESPN	L 73–79	14,463	6–3
Tue, Dec 28	7 P.M.	Niagara	#18	Frank Erwin Center • Austin, Texas	UT Syndicated TV	W 85–48	7,577	7–3
Sun, Jan 2	TBA	Houston	#18	Frank Erwin Center • Austin, Texas	Fox Sports Southwest (Texas)	W 90–80	7,926	8–3
Thu, Jan 6	7 P.M.	Baylor*	#17	Frank Erwin Center • Austin, Texas	UT Syndicated TV	W 71–43	10,495	9–3 (1–0 Big 12)
Mon, Jan 10	8 P.M.	@ #5 Connecticut	#15	Hartford Civic Center • Hartford, Connecticut	ESPN	L 67–77	16,294	9–4
Wed, Jan 12	7 P.M.	@ Texas A&M*	#15	Reed Arena • College Station, Texas	UT Syndicated TV	W 78–51	6,074	10–4 (2–0)
Sat, Jan 15	8 P.M.	#16 Oklahoma*	#15	Frank Erwin Center • Austin, Texas	Big 12 TV (ESPN Plus)	W 79–66	15,123	11–4 (3–0)
Wed, Jan 19	8 P.M.	@ #12 Oklahoma State*	#14	Gallagher-Iba Arena • Stillwater, Oklahoma	Big 12 TV (ESPN Plus)	L 65–73	6,381	11–5 (3–1)
Sat, Jan 22	7 P.M.	@ Texas Tech*	#14	United Spirit Arena • Lubbock, Texas	Fox Sports Southwest (Texas)	W 72–59	14,045	12–5 (4–1)
Tue, Jan 25	8 P.M.	Nebraska*	#17	Frank Erwin Center • Austin, Texas	Big 12 TV (ESPN Plus)	W 82–55	11,242	13–5 (5–1)
Sat, Jan 29	5 P.M.	Colorado*	#17	Frank Erwin Center • Austin, Texas	Fox Sports Southwest (Texas)	W 75–65	13,010	14–5 (6–1)
Mon, Jan 31	8 P.M.	@ #18 Oklahoma*	#16	Lloyd Noble Center • Norman, Oklahoma	ESPN	L 59–83	12,053	14–6 (6–2)
Sat, Feb 5	2 P.M.	@ Massachusetts	#16	Mullins Center • Amherst, Massachusetts	ABC	W 68–57	8,145	15–6
Wed, Feb 9	7 P.M.	Texas Tech*	#18	Frank Erwin Center • Austin, Texas	Fox Sports Southwest (Texas)	W 76–60	9,186	16–6 (7–2)
Sat, Feb 12	12:45 P.M.	@ Missouri*	#18	Hearnes Center • Columbia, Missouri	Big 12 TV (ESPN Plus)	W 66–63	13,383	17–6 (8–2)
Wed, Feb 16	8 P.M.	#8 Oklahoma State*	#17	Frank Erwin Center • Austin, Texas	Big 12 TV (ESPN Plus)	W 68–57	15,525	18–6 (9–2)
Sat, Feb 19	12:45 P.M.	@ Baylor*	#17	Ferrell Center • Waco, Texas	Big 12 TV (ESPN Plus)	W 60–38	4,886	19–6 (10–2)
Tue, Feb 22	7 P.M.	@ #17 Iowa State*	#14	Hilton Coliseum • Ames, Iowa	UT Syndicated TV	L 77–89	13,731	19–7 (10–3)
Sat, Feb 26	12:45 P.M.	Texas A&M*	#14	Frank Erwin Center • Austin, Texas	Big 12 TV (ESPN Plus)	W 85–58	11,451	20–7 (11–3)
Mon, Feb 28	8 P.M.	#23 Kansas*	#16	Frank Erwin Center • Austin, Texas	ESPN	W 68–54	13,561	21–7 (12–3)
Sat, Mar 4	7 P.M.	@ Kansas State*	#16	Bramlage Coliseum • Manhattan, Kansas		W 99–70	9,567	22–7 (13–3)
2000 Big 12 Conference tournament — No. 2 Seed
Fri, Mar 10	TBA	vs. (7) Colorado*	#13	Kemper Arena • Kansas City, Missouri (Big 12 Conference tournament quarterfinals)	Big 12 TV (ESPN Plus)	W 78–35	19,100	23–7
Sat, Mar 11	TBA	vs. (3) #15 Oklahoma*	#13	Kemper Arena • Kansas City, Missouri (Big 12 Conference tournament semifinals)	Big 12 TV (ESPN Plus)	L 65–81	19,100	23–8
2000 NCAA tournament — No. 5 Seed
Thu, Mar 16	TBA	vs. (12) Indiana State	#15	Jon M. Huntsman Center • Salt Lake City, Utah (NCAA Tournament First Round)	CBS	W 77–61	12,691	24–8
Sat, Mar 18	TBA	vs. (4) #10 Louisiana State	#15	Jon M. Huntsman Center • Salt Lake City, Utah (NCAA Tournament Second Round)	CBS	L 67–72	13,794	24–9
*Big 12 Conference Game. ^{#}Rank according to Associated Press (AP) Poll. ^{OT} indicates overtime.

== 2000–01 season ==
=== Schedule and results ===
2000–01 Big 12 men's basketball standings
	Conf.				Overall
Team	W		L	PCT	W		L	PCT
No. 10 Iowa State	13	–	3	.813	25	–	6	.806
No. 12 Kansas	12	–	4	.750	26	–	7	.788
No. 13 Oklahoma †	12	–	4	.750	26	–	7	.788
No. 18 Texas	12	–	4	.750	25	–	9	.735
Oklahoma State	10	–	6	.625	20	–	10	.667
Missouri	9	–	7	.563	20	–	13	.606
Nebraska	7	–	9	.438	14	–	16	.467
Baylor	6	–	10	.375	19	–	12	.613
Colorado	5	–	11	.313	15	–	15	.500
Kansas State	4	–	12	.250	11	–	18	.379
Texas A&M	3	–	13	.188	10	–	20	.333
Texas Tech	3	–	13	.188	9	–	19	.321
† 2001 Big 12 Tournament winner Rankings from AP poll

NCAA First Round; Coach: Rick Barnes; Overall record: 25–9; Big 12 record: 12–4; Big 12 standing: T-2nd; Final AP Poll: 18th Final ESPN/USA Today Coaches' Poll: NR
Date	Opponent^{#}	Rank^{#}	Site	TV, Time	Result	Record
Regular season
Mon, Nov 13	vs. Navy	—	Frank Erwin Center • Austin, Texas (TiVo Preseason NIT First Round)	UT Syndicated TV, 7 P.M.	W 79–65	1–0
Wed, Nov 15	California	—	Frank Erwin Center • Austin, Texas (TiVo Preseason NIT Second Round)	ESPN2, 7 P.M.	W 57–54	2–0
Wed, Nov 22	vs. #2 Duke	—	Madison Square Garden • New York City (TiVo Preseason NIT Semifinal)	ESPN, 7:30 P.M.	L 69–95	2–1
Fri, Nov 24	vs. Indiana	—	Madison Square Garden • New York (TiVo Preseason NIT Third-Place Game)		W 70–58	3–1
Tue, Nov 28	Texas-San Antonio	—	Frank Erwin Center • Austin, Texas	UT Syndicated TV, 7 P.M.	W 70–51	4–1
Sat, Dec 2	Southwest Texas	—	Frank Erwin Center • Austin, Texas	TBA	W 90–60	5–1
Sat, Dec 9	@ South Florida	—	Sun Dome • Tampa, Florida	ESPN2, 6:30 P.M.	L 69–87	5–2
Sat, Dec 16	Texas A&M–Corpus Christi	—	Frank Erwin Center • Austin, Texas	UT Syndicated TV, 1 P.M.	W 79–71	5–2
Wed, Dec 20	@ Houston	—	Hofheinz Pavilion • Houston, Texas	UT Syndicated TV, 7 P.M.	W 71–60	6–2
Sat, Dec 23	#5 Illinois	—	Frank Erwin Center • Austin, Texas	ESPN2, 5:30 P.M.	W 72–64	7–2
Thu, Dec 28	UNC Asheville	—	Frank Erwin Center • Austin, Texas	UT Syndicated TV, 7:30 P.M.	W 74–43	8–2
Sat, Dec 30	Utah	—	Frank Erwin Center • Austin, Texas	UT Syndicated TV, 7 P.M.	W 70–59	10–2
Sat, Jan 6	Oklahoma State*	#24	Frank Erwin Center • Austin, Texas	ESPN+, 8 P.M.	W 78–71	11–2 (1–0 Big 12)
Wed, Jan 10	Kansas State*	#23	Frank Erwin Center • Austin, Texas	UT Syndicated TV, 7 P.M.	W 63–41	12–2 (2–0)
Sat, Jan 13	@ Nebraska*	#23	Devaney Center • Lincoln, Nebraska	ESPN+, 12:45 P.M.	L 67–80	12–3 (2–1)
Mon, Jan 15	#15 Connecticut	—	Frank Erwin Center • Austin, Texas	ESPN, 8 P.M.	W 60–56	13–3
Wed, Jan 17	@ Texas A&M*	—	Reed Arena • College Station, Texas	ESPN+, 8 P.M.	W 76–58	14–3 (3–1)
Sat, Jan 20	Baylor*	—	Frank Erwin Center • Austin, Texas	ESPN+, 12:45 P.M.	W 73–66 ^{OT}	15–3 (4–1)
Wed, Jan 24	@ Oklahoma*	#20	Lloyd Noble Center • Norman, Oklahoma	ESPN+, 8 P.M.	L 68–75	15–4 (4–2)
Sat, Jan 27	@ #12 Arizona	#20	McKale Center • Tucson, Arizona	ABC, 12 P.M.	L 52–80	15–5
Tue, Jan 30	Texas A&M*	—	Frank Erwin Center • Austin, Texas	ESPN+, 8 P.M.	W 81–61	16–5 (5–2)
Sat, Feb 3	@ #3 Kansas*	—	Allen Fieldhouse • Lawrence, Kansas	CBS, 12 P.M.	L 66–82	16–6 (5–3)
Wed, Feb 7	@ Colorado*	—	Coors Events Center • Boulder, Colorado	UT Syndicated TV, 8 P.M.	W 77–72	17–6 (6–3)
Sat, Feb 10	#21 Oklahoma*	—	Frank Erwin Center • Austin, Texas	ESPN, 8 P.M.	L 54–75	17–7 (6–4)
Tue, Feb 13	Texas Tech*	—	Frank Erwin Center • Austin, Texas	UT Syndicated TV, 7 P.M.	W 73–56	18–7 (7–4)
Sat, Feb 17	@ Oklahoma State*	—	Gallagher-Iba Arena • Stillwater, Oklahoma	ABC, 12 P.M.	W 80–69 ^{OT}	19–7 (8–4)
Wed, Feb 21	@ Baylor*	—	Ferrell Center • Waco, Texas	Fox Sports Southwest, 7:30 P.M.	W 69–59	20–7 (9–4)
Sat, Feb 24	#6 Iowa State*	—	Frank Erwin Center • Austin, Texas	ESPN, 8 P.M.	W 94–78	21–7 (10–4)
Mon, Feb 26	Missouri*	#24	Frank Erwin Center • Austin, Texas	ESPN, 8 P.M.	W 76–61	22–7 (11–4)
Sat, Mar 3	@ Texas Tech*	#24	United Spirit Arena • Lubbock, Texas	ESPN+, 12:45 P.M.	W 78–55	23–7 (12–4)
2001 Big 12 Conference tournament — No. 4 Seed
Fri, Mar 9	vs. (5) Oklahoma State*	#20	Kemper Arena • Kansas City, Missouri (Big 12 Conference tournament quarterfinals)	ESPN+	W 55–54	24–7
Sat, Mar 10	vs. (8) Baylor*	#20	Kemper Arena • Kansas City, Missouri (Big 12 Conference tournament semifinals)	ESPN+	W 76–62	25–7
Sun, Mar 11	vs. (3) #16 Oklahoma*	#20	Kemper Arena • Kansas City, Missouri (Big 12 Conference tournament finals)	ESPN, 2 P.M.	L 45–54	25–8
2001 NCAA tournament — No. 6 Seed
Fri, Mar 16	vs. (11) Temple	#18	Louisiana Superdome • New Orleans, Louisiana (NCAA Tournament First Round)	CBS	L 65–79	25–9
*Big 12 Conference Game. ^{#}Rank according to Associated Press (AP) Poll. ^{OT} indicates overtime.

== 2001–02 season ==
=== Schedule and results ===
2001–02 Big 12 men's basketball standings
	Conf.				Overall
Team	W		L	PCT	W		L	PCT
No. 2 Kansas	16	–	0	1.000	33	–	4	.892
No. 3 Oklahoma †	13	–	3	.813	31	–	5	.861
Texas	10	–	6	.625	22	–	12	.647
No. 20 Oklahoma State	10	–	6	.625	23	–	9	.719
Texas Tech	10	–	6	.625	23	–	9	.719
Missouri	9	–	7	.563	24	–	12	.667
Kansas State	6	–	10	.375	13	–	16	.448
Nebraska	6	–	10	.375	13	–	15	.464
Colorado	5	–	11	.313	15	–	14	.517
Baylor	4	–	12	.250	14	–	16	.467
Iowa State	4	–	12	.250	12	–	19	.387
Texas A&M	3	–	13	.188	9	–	22	.290
† 2002 Big 12 Tournament winner Rankings from AP poll

NCAA Sweet Sixteen; Coach: Rick Barnes; Overall record: 22–12; Big 12 record: 10–6; Big 12 Standing: T-3rd; Final AP Poll: NR; Final ESPN/USA Today Coaches' Poll: 19th
Date	Time^{†}	Opponent^{#}	Rank^{#}	Site	TV	Result	Record
Exhibition games
Wed, Nov 7	7 p.m.	Alaska Anchorage	#23	Frank Erwin Center • Austin, Texas		W 122–72	(1–0 exhib.)
Tue, Nov 13	7 p.m.	EA Sports Midwest All-Stars	#23	Frank Erwin Center • Austin, Texas		W 91–73	(2–0 exhib.)
Regular season
Sat, Nov 17	7 p.m.	Arizona	#23	Frank Erwin Center • Austin, Texas	FSN	L 74–88	0–1
Thu, Nov 22	8:30 p.m.	vs. Oregon State	—	Sullivan Arena • Anchorage, Alaska (Carr/Safeway Great Alaska Shootout)	?	W 78–68	1–1
Fri, Nov 23	8:30 p.m.	vs. Gonzaga	—	Sullivan Arena • Anchorage, Alaska (Carr/Safeway Great Alaska Shootout)	?	L 64–67	1–2
Sat, Nov 24	8 p.m.	vs. #20 Indiana	—	Sullivan Arena • Anchorage, Alaska (Carr/Safeway Great Alaska Shootout)	?	L 71–77	1–3
Sat, Dec 1	11 a.m.	vs. #11 Stanford	—	United Center • Chicago (Dell Classic 4 Kids)	FSN	W 83–75 ^{OT}	2–3
Wed, Dec 5	7 p.m.	Texas A&M–Corpus Christi	—	Frank Erwin Center • Austin, Texas	FSNSW	W 89–64	3–3
Mon, Dec 10	7 p.m.	Washington State	—	Frank Erwin Center • Austin, Texas	FSNSW (Texas)	W 79–52	4–3
Sat, Dec 15	7 p.m.	Jacksonville	—	Frank Erwin Center • Austin, Texas	FSNSW	W 96–90	5–3
Wed, Dec 19	7 p.m.	McNeese State	—	Frank Erwin Center • Austin, Texas	FSNSW	W 80–67	6–3
Sat, Dec 22	7:30 p.m.	@ UNLV	—	Thomas & Mack Center • Las Vegas, Nevada (Las Vegas Showdown)	?	W 87–78	7–3
Sat, Dec 29	2:30 p.m.	@ Utah	—	Jon M. Huntsman Center • Salt Lake City, Utah	ABC	L 61–71	7–4
Wed, Jan 2	7 p.m.	Texas–Pan American	—	Frank Erwin Center • Austin, Texas	FSNSW	W 81–69	8–4
Sat, Jan 5	3 p.m.	@ #5 Oklahoma State*	—	Gallagher-Iba Arena • Stillwater, Oklahoma	ESPN Plus	W 71–60	9–4 (1–0 Big 12)
Mon, Jan 7	8 p.m.	Providence	—	Frank Erwin Center • Austin, Texas	ESPN	W 68–48	10–4
Sat, Jan 12	5 p.m.	Baylor*	—	Frank Erwin Center • Austin, Texas	FSNSW (Texas)	W 102–78	11–4 (2–0)
Mon, Jan 14	8 p.m.	@ Texas Tech*	—	United Spirit Arena • Lubbock, Texas	ESPN	W 74–71 ^{OT}	12–4 (3–0)
Sat, Jan 19	3 p.m.	Nebraska*	—	Frank Erwin Center • Austin, Texas	ESPN Plus	W 77–66	13–4 (4–0)
Wed, Jan 23	8 p.m.	Texas A&M*	#24	Frank Erwin Center • Austin, Texas	ESPN Plus	L 74–80	13–5 (4–1)
Sat, Jan 26	8 p.m.	@ Baylor*	#24	Ferrell Center • Waco, Texas	ESPN Plus	W 69–63	14–5 (5–1)
Wed, Jan 30	7 p.m.	@ Kansas State*	—	Bramlage Coliseum • Manhattan, Kansas		L 70–71	14–6 (5–2)
Sat, Feb 2	3 p.m.	#6 Oklahoma*	—	Frank Erwin Center • Austin, Texas	ESPN Plus	L 84–85 ^{OT}	14–7 (5–3)
Wed, Feb 6	7 p.m.	@ Texas A&M*	—	Reed Arena • College Station, Texas	FSNSW	W 66–52	15–7 (6–3)
Sat, Feb 9	11 a.m.	Colorado*	—	Frank Erwin Center • Austin, Texas	ABC	W 104–95	16–7 (7–3)
Mon, Feb 11	8 p.m.	#2 Kansas*	—	Frank Erwin Center • Austin, Texas	ESPN	L 103–110 ^{OT}	16–8 (7–4)
Sun, Feb 17	2:30 p.m.	@ Missouri*	—	Hearnes Center • Columbia, Missouri	ABC	W 72–70	17–8 (8–4)
Wed, Feb 20	7 p.m.	#13 Oklahoma State*	—	Frank Erwin Center • Austin, Texas	ESPN2/ESPN Plus	L 80–85	17–9 (8–5)
Sat, Feb 23	8 p.m.	@ #6 Oklahoma*	—	Lloyd Noble Center • Norman, Oklahoma	ESPN	L 78–96	17–10 (8–6)
Tue, Feb 26	8 p.m.	Texas Tech*	—	Frank Erwin Center • Austin, Texas	ESPN+	W 96–71	18–10 (9–6)
Sat, Mar 2	8 p.m.	@ Iowa State*	—	Hilton Coliseum • Ames, Iowa	?	W 79–76	19–10 (10–6)
2002 Big 12 Conference tournament — No. 3 Seed
Fri, Mar 8	8:20 p.m.	vs. (6) Missouri*	—	Kemper Arena • Kansas City, Missouri (Big 12 Conference tournament quarterfinals)	ESPN Plus	W 89–85	20–10
Sat, Mar 9	3:20 p.m.	vs. (2) #4 Oklahoma*	—	Kemper Arena • Kansas City, Missouri (Big 12 Conference tournament semifinals)	ESPN Plus	L 51–67	20–11
2002 NCAA tournament — No. 6 Seed
Fri, Mar 15	9:20 p.m.	vs. (11) Boston College	—	American Airlines Center • Dallas, Texas (NCAA Tournament First Round)	CBS	W 70–57	21–11
Sun, Mar 17	1:15 p.m.	vs. (3) #17 Mississippi State	—	American Airlines Center • Dallas, Texas (NCAA Tournament Second Round)	CBS	W 68–64	22–11
Fri, Mar 22	6:55 p.m.	vs. (2) #11 Oregon	—	Kohl Center • Madison, Wisconsin (NCAA Tournament Sweet Sixteen)	CBS	L 70–72	22–12
*Big 12 Conference Game. ^{†}All times in Central Standard Time. ^{#}Rank according to Associated Press (AP) Poll. ^{OT} indicates overtime.

== 2002–03 season ==
=== Schedule and results ===
2002–03 Big 12 men's basketball standings
	Conf.				Overall
Team	W		L	PCT	W		L	PCT
No. 6 Kansas	14	–	2	.875	30	–	8	.789
No. 5 Texas	13	–	3	.813	26	–	7	.788
No. 3 Oklahoma †	12	–	4	.750	27	–	7	.794
Oklahoma State	10	–	6	.625	22	–	10	.688
No. 24 Missouri	9	–	7	.563	22	–	11	.667
Colorado	9	–	7	.563	20	–	12	.625
Texas Tech	6	–	10	.375	22	–	13	.629
Texas A&M	6	–	10	.375	14	–	14	.500
Iowa State	5	–	11	.313	17	–	14	.548
Baylor	5	–	11	.313	14	–	14	.500
Kansas State	4	–	12	.250	13	–	17	.433
Nebraska	3	–	13	.188	11	–	19	.367
† 2003 Big 12 Tournament winner Rankings from AP poll

NCAA Final Four; Coach: Rick Barnes; Overall record: 26–7; Big 12 record: 13–3; Big 12 standing: 2nd Final AP Poll: 5th Final ESPN/USA Today Coaches' Poll: 3rd
Date	Time^{†}	Opponent^{#}	Rank^{#}	Site	TV	Result	Record
Exhibition games
Mon, Nov 4	7 p.m.	Tarleton State	—	Frank Erwin Center • Austin, Texas		W 93–43	(1–0 exhib.)
Sun, Nov 10	4 p.m.	EA Sports All-Stars	—	Frank Erwin Center • Austin, Texas		W 102–88	(2–0 exhib.)
Regular season
Fri, Nov 15	8 p.m.	vs. #16 Georgia	#4	Madison Square Garden • New York City (AT&T Wireless Classic)	ESPN2	W 77–71	1–0
Sat, Nov 23	7 p.m.	Stephen F. Austin	#3	Frank Erwin Center • Austin, Texas	FSNSW (Texas)	W 81–55	2–0
Wed, Nov 27	7 p.m.	Texas-Arlington	#3	Frank Erwin Center • Austin, Texas	FSNSW	W 76–45	3–0
Sat, Nov 30	3:30 p.m.	vs. Seton Hall	#3	Reliant Stadium • Houston, Texas (Space City Hoops Classic)	?	W 78–61	4–0
Sat, Dec 7	noon	vs. George Washington	#2	MCI Center • Washington, D.C. (BB&T Classic)	Raycom Network	W 100–92	5–0
Sun, Dec 8	2:30 p.m.	vs. Notre Dame	#2	MCI Center • Washington, D.C. (BB&T Classic)	Raycom Network	L 92–98	5–1
Sun, Dec 15	3:30 p.m.	@ #1 Arizona	#8	McKale Center • Tucson, Arizona	?	L 70–73	5–2
Thu, Dec 19	7 p.m.	McNeese State	#10	Frank Erwin Center • Austin, Texas	FSNSW (Texas)	W 97–59	6–2
Sun, Dec 22	4 p.m.	Princeton	#10	Frank Erwin Center • Austin, Texas	ESPN	W 57–54	7–2
Mon, Dec 30	7 p.m.	Louisiana Tech	#7	Frank Erwin Center • Austin, Texas	FSNSW (Texas)	W 58–50	8–2
Sun, Jan 5	1 p.m.	Mount St. Mary's	#7	Frank Erwin Center • Austin, Texas		W 80–64	9–2
Sat, Jan 11	8 p.m.	Iowa State*	#8	Frank Erwin Center • Austin, Texas	ESPN Plus	W 70–50	10–2 (1–0 Big 12)
Wed, Jan 15	8 p.m.	@ Baylor*	#4	Ferrell Center • Waco, Texas	ESPN Plus	W 82–71	11–2 (2–0)
Sat, Jan 18	7 p.m.	Texas A&M*	#4	Frank Erwin Center • Austin, Texas	FSNSW (Texas)	W 89–61	12–2 (3–0)
Sat, Jan 25	3 p.m.	#21 Missouri*	#4	Frank Erwin Center • Austin, Texas	ESPN Plus	W 76–55	13–2 (4–0)
Mon, Jan 27	8 p.m.	@ #12 Kansas*	#3	Allen Fieldhouse • Lawrence, Kansas	ESPN	L 87–90	13–3 (4–1)
Sat, Feb 1	3 p.m.	#9 Oklahoma State*	#3	Frank Erwin Center • Austin, Texas	ESPN	W 78–65	14–3 (5–1)
Tue, Feb 4	8 p.m.	@ Colorado*	#3	Coors Events Center • Boulder, Colorado	Local	L 80–93	14–4 (5–2)
Sat, Feb 8	7 p.m.	@ Texas A&M*	#3	Reed Arena • College Station, Texas	ESPN2	W 95–87	15–4 (6–2)
Mon, Feb 10	8 p.m.	#5 Oklahoma*	#6	Frank Erwin Center • Austin, Texas	ESPN	W 67–61	16–4 (7–2)
Sat, Feb 15	12:45 p.m.	@ Nebraska*	#6	Devaney Center • Lincoln, Nebraska	ESPN Plus	W 75–63	17–4 (8–2)
Mon, Feb 17	8 p.m.	Texas Tech*	#3	Frank Erwin Center • Austin, Texas	ESPN	W 77–65	18–4 (9–2)
Sat, Feb 22	3 p.m.	@ #16 Oklahoma State*	#3	Gallagher-Iba Arena • Stillwater, Oklahoma	ESPN Plus	L 77–82	18–5 (9–3)
Wed, Feb 26	7 p.m.	Baylor*	#5	Frank Erwin Center • Austin, Texas	FSNSW (Texas)	W 82–64	19–5 (10–3)
Sat, Mar 1	3 p.m.	@ Texas Tech*	#5	United Spirit Arena • Lubbock, Texas	CBS	W 76–71	20–5 (11–3)
Tue, Mar 4	7 p.m.	Kansas State*	#4	Frank Erwin Center • Austin, Texas	FSNSW (Texas)	W 74–60	21–5 (12–3)
Sat, Mar 8	2:30 p.m.	@ #5 Oklahoma*	#4	Lloyd Noble Center • Norman, Oklahoma	ABC	W 76–71	22–5 (13–3)
2003 Big 12 Conference tournament — No. 2 Seed
Fri, Mar 14	6 p.m.	vs. (7) Texas Tech*	#3	American Airlines Center • Dallas, Texas (Big 12 Conference tournament quarterfinals)	ESPN Plus	L 81–92	22–6
2003 NCAA tournament — No. 1 Seed
Fri, Mar 21	11:30 a.m.	vs. (16) UNC Asheville	#5	Birmingham-Jefferson Civic Center • Birmingham, Alabama (NCAA Tournament First Round)	CBS	W 82–61	23–6
Sun, Mar 23	3:50 p.m.	vs. (9) Purdue	#5	Birmingham-Jefferson Civic Center • Birmingham, Alabama (NCAA Tournament Second Round)	CBS	W 77–67	24–6
Fri, Mar 28	6:27 p.m.	vs. (5) #23 Connecticut	#5	Alamodome • San Antonio, Texas (NCAA Tournament Sweet Sixteen)	CBS	W 82–78	25–6
Sun, Mar 30	4:05 p.m.	vs. (7) Michigan State	#5	Alamodome • San Antonio, Texas (NCAA Tournament Elite Eight)	CBS	W 85–76	26–6
Sat, Apr 5	7:47 p.m.	vs. (3) #13 Syracuse	#5	Louisiana Superdome • New Orleans, Louisiana (NCAA Tournament Final Four)	CBS	L 84–95	26–7
*Big 12 Conference Game. ^{†}All times in Central Standard Time. ^{#}Rank according to Associated Press (AP) Poll. ^{OT} indicates overtime.

== 2003–04 season ==
=== Schedule and results ===
2003–04 Big 12 men's basketball standings
	Conf.				Overall
Team	W		L	PCT	W		L	PCT
No. 4 Oklahoma State †	14	–	2	.875	31	–	4	.886
No. 12 Texas	12	–	4	.750	25	–	8	.758
No. 16 Kansas	12	–	4	.750	24	–	9	.727
Colorado	10	–	6	.625	18	–	11	.621
Texas Tech	9	–	7	.563	23	–	11	.676
Missouri	9	–	7	.563	16	–	14	.533
Oklahoma	8	–	8	.500	20	–	11	.645
Iowa State	7	–	9	.438	20	–	13	.606
Kansas State	6	–	10	.375	14	–	14	.500
Nebraska	6	–	10	.375	18	–	13	.581
Baylor	3	–	13	.188	8	–	21	.276
Texas A&M	0	–	16	.000	7	–	21	.250
† 2004 Big 12 Tournament winner Rankings from AP poll

NCAA Sweet Sixteen; Coach: Rick Barnes; Overall record: 25–8; Big 12 record: 12–4; Big 12 standing: T-2nd; Final AP Poll: 12th Final ESPN/USA Today Coaches' Poll: 10th
Date	Time^{†}	Opponent^{#}	Rank^{#}	Site	TV	Result	Record
Exhibition games
Fri, Nov 7	7 p.m.	Southwest All-Stars	—	Frank Erwin Center • Austin, Texas		W 107–60	(1–0 exhib.)
Wed, Nov 12	7 p.m.	EA Sports All-Stars	#12	Frank Erwin Center • Austin, Texas		W 110–80	(2–0 exhib.)
Regular season
Mon, Nov 17	7 p.m.	Brown	#11	Frank Erwin Center • Austin, Texas (NABC Classic)	FSNSW (Texas)	W 89–51	1–0
Mon, Nov 24	7 p.m.	Sam Houston	#11	Frank Erwin Center • Austin, Texas	FSNSW (Texas)	W 122–71	2–0
Sat, Nov 29	7 p.m.	Centenary	#11	Frank Erwin Center • Austin, Texas	FSNSW (Texas)	W 94–59	3–0
Thu, Dec 4	7 p.m.	Wofford	#11	Frank Erwin Center • Austin, Texas	FSNSW (Texas)	W 103–72	4–0
Tue, Dec 9	8:30 p.m.	vs. #9 Arizona	#6	Madison Square Garden • New York City (Jimmy V Men's Basketball Classic)	ESPN	L 83–91	4–1
Sun, Dec 14	6 p.m.	New Orleans	#6	Frank Erwin Center • Austin, Texas		W 89–55	5–1
Sat, Dec 20	11 a.m.	#3 Duke	#11	Madison Square Garden • New York (Dreyfus Classic)	ESPN	L 61–89	5–2
Mon, Dec 29	6 p.m.	George Washington	#18	Frank Erwin Center • Austin, Texas	ESPN2	W 88–72	6–2
Fri, Jan 2	7 p.m.	Texas-Arlington	#19	Frank Erwin Center • Austin, Texas	FSNSW (Texas)	W 99–79	7–2
Mon, Jan 5	6 p.m.	@ #25 Providence	#18	Dunkin' Donuts Center • Providence, Rhode Island	ESPN	W 79–77 ^{OT}	8–2
Sat, Jan 10	7:30 p.m.	Baylor*	#18	Frank Erwin Center • Austin, Texas	FSNSW (Texas)	W 79–57	9–2 (1–0 Big 12)
Tue, Jan 13	7 p.m.	#4 Wake Forest	#18	Frank Erwin Center • Austin, Texas	ESPN2	W 94–81	10–2
Sat, Jan 17	12:30 p.m.	Nebraska*	#18	Frank Erwin Center • Austin, Texas	ESPN Plus	W 63–61	11–2 (2–0)
Tue, Jan 20	8 p.m.	@ Missouri*	#16	Hearnes Center • Columbia, Missouri	ESPN	W 75–69 ^{OT}	12–2 (3–0)
Sat, Jan 24	3 p.m.	#24 Oklahoma State*	#16	Frank Erwin Center • Austin, Texas	ESPN	L 67–72	12–3 (3–1)
Mon, Jan 26	6 p.m.	@ #13 Texas Tech*	#16	United Spirit Arena • Lubbock, Texas	ESPN	W 62–61 ^{OT}	13–3 (4–1)
Sat, Jan 31	12:45 p.m.	@ Texas A&M*	#16	Reed Arena • College Station, Texas	ESPN Plus	W 69–59	14–3 (5–1)
Wed, Feb 4	7 p.m.	Colorado*	#11	Frank Erwin Center • Austin, Texas	ESPN2	W 76–63	15–3 (6–1)
Sun, Feb 8	noon	#22 Oklahoma*	#11	Frank Erwin Center • Austin, Texas	CBS	W 66–37	16–3 (7–1)
Tue, Feb 10	8 p.m.	@ Baylor*	#11	Ferrell Center • Waco, Texas	FSNSW (Texas)	W 84–58	17–3 (8–1)
Sat, Feb 14	3 p.m.	@ Iowa State*	#11	Hilton Coliseum • Ames, Iowa	ESPN Plus	L 77–78	17–4 (8–2)
Wed, Feb 18	8 p.m.	Texas A&M*	#11	Frank Erwin Center • Austin, Texas	FSNSW (Texas)	W 77–57	18–4 (9–2)
Sat, Feb 21	8 p.m.	@ Oklahoma*	#11	Lloyd Noble Center • Norman, Oklahoma	ESPN	W 68–63	19–4 (10–2)
Mon, Feb 23	8 p.m.	#20 Kansas*	#10	Frank Erwin Center • Austin, Texas	ESPN	W 82–67	20–4 (11–2)
Sat, Feb 28	1 p.m.	#25 Texas Tech*	#10	Frank Erwin Center • Austin, Texas	CBS	W 74–71	21–4 (12–2)
Mon, Mar 1	8 p.m.	@ #8 Oklahoma State*	#10	Gallagher-Iba Arena • Stillwater, Oklahoma	ESPN	L 67–76	21–5 (12–3)
Sat, Mar 6	4 p.m.	@ Kansas State*	#10	Bramlage Coliseum • Manhattan, Kansas	ESPN	L 48–58	21–6 (12–4)
2004 Big 12 Conference tournament — No. 2 Seed
Fri, Mar 12	6 p.m.	vs. (7) Oklahoma*	#11	American Airlines Center • Dallas, Texas (Big 12 Conference tournament quarterfinals)	ESPN Plus	W 66–63	22–6
Sat, Mar 13	3:20 p.m.	vs. (3) #18 Kansas*	#11	American Airlines Center • Dallas, Texas (Big 12 Conference tournament semifinals)	ESPN2/ESPN Plus	W 64–60	23–6
Sun, Mar 14	3:20 p.m.	vs. (1) #7 Oklahoma State*	#11	American Airlines Center • Dallas, Texas (Big 12 Conference tournament finals)	ESPN	L 49–65	23–7
2004 NCAA tournament — No. 3 Seed
Thu, Mar 18	6:20 p.m.	vs. (14) Princeton	#12	Pepsi Center • Denver, Colorado (NCAA Tournament First Round)	CBS	W 66–49	24–7
Sat, Mar 20	7:10 p.m.	vs. (6) #18 North Carolina	#12	Pepsi Center • Denver, Colorado (NCAA Tournament Second Round)	CBS	W 78–75	25–7
Fri, Mar 26	6:27 p.m.	vs. (7) Xavier	#12	Georgia Dome • Atlanta (NCAA Tournament Sweet Sixteen)	CBS	L 71–79	25–8
*Big 12 Conference Game. ^{†}All times in Central Standard Time. ^{#}Rank according to Associated Press (AP) Poll. ^{OT} indicates overtime.

== 2004–05 season ==
=== Schedule and results ===
NCAA First Round; Coach: Rick Barnes; Overall record: 20–11; Big 12 record: 9–7; Big 12 Standing: T-5th; Final AP Poll: NR; Final ESPN/USA Today Coaches' Poll: NR
Date	Time^{†}	Opponent^{#}	Rank^{#}	Site	TV	Home attendance	Result	Record
Exhibition games
Tue, Nov 9	7 p.m.	Lenoir-Rhyne	#16	Frank Erwin Center • Austin, Texas			W 92–47	(1–0 exhib.)
Mon, Nov 15	7 p.m.	Tarleton State	#16	Frank Erwin Center • Austin, Texas			W 86–53	(2–0 exhib.)
Regular season
Fri, Nov 19	7 p.m.	Texas State	#16	Frank Erwin Center • Austin, Texas		10221	W 95–63	1–0
Mon, Nov 22	1:30 p.m.	vs. Chaminade	#15	Lahaina Civic Center • Lahaina, Hawaii (EA Sports Maui Invitational First Round)	ESPN2		W 84–62	2–0
Tue, Nov 23	6 p.m.	vs. Iowa	#15	Lahaina Civic Center • Lahaina, Hawaii (EA Sports Maui Invitational Semifinals)	ESPN		L 80–82	2–1
Wed, Nov 24	3:30 p.m.	vs. Tennessee	#15	Lahaina Civic Center • Lahaina, Hawaii (EA Sports Maui Invitational Third-Place Game)	ESPN2		W 90–75	3–1
Mon, Nov 29	7 p.m.	Coppin State	#18	Frank Erwin Center • Austin, Texas	FSNSW	6093	W 91–60	4–1
Sat, Dec 4	1 p.m.	@ Seton Hall	#18	Continental Airlines Arena • East Rutherford, New Jersey			W 70–62	5–1
Tue, Dec 7	7 p.m.	North Texas	#14	Frank Erwin Center • Austin, Texas	FSNSW	6482	W 86–57	6–1
Wed, Dec 15	7 p.m.	Texas-Arlington	#14	Frank Erwin Center • Austin, Texas	FSNSW	6617	W 85–70	7–1
Sat, Dec 18	1 p.m.	@ #6 Wake Forest	#14	Lawrence Joel Coliseum • Winston-Salem, North Carolina	ESPN		L 88–89	7–2
Wed, Dec 22	7 p.m.	Centenary	#15	Frank Erwin Center • Austin, Texas	FSNSW	7052	W 97–52	8–2
Wed, Dec 29	7 p.m.	Texas-San Antonio	#15	Frank Erwin Center • Austin, Texas	FSNSW (Texas)	8057	W 100–82	9–2
Sun, Jan 2	7 p.m.	UNLV	#15	Frank Erwin Center • Austin, Texas		8138	W 89–82	10–2
Thu, Jan 6	8 p.m.	Memphis	#15	Frank Erwin Center • Austin, Texas	ESPN2	12022	W 74–67	11–2
Sun, Jan 9	2 p.m.	Baylor*	#15	Frank Erwin Center • Austin, Texas	FSNSW (Texas)	11463	W 79–60	12–2 (1–0 Big 12)
Wed, Jan 12	7 p.m.	@ Texas A&M*	#10	Reed Arena • College Station, Texas	FSNSW (Texas)		L 63–74	12–3 (1–1)
Sat, Jan 15	12:30 p.m.	@ Nebraska*	#10	Devaney Center • Lincoln, Nebraska	ESPN Plus		W 63–53	13–3 (2–1)
Mon, Jan 17	8 p.m.	#5 Oklahoma State*	#15	Frank Erwin Center • Austin, Texas	ESPN	16755	W 75–61	14–3 (3–1)
Sat, Jan 22	2:45 p.m.	@ #18 Oklahoma*	#11	Lloyd Noble Center • Norman, Oklahoma	CBS		L 60–64	14–4 (3–2)
Tue, Jan 25	8 p.m.	Texas Tech*	#16	Frank Erwin Center • Austin, Texas	ESPN Plus	16080	W 80–73	15–4 (4–2)
Sat, Jan 29	8 p.m.	@ #6 Kansas*	#16	Allen Fieldhouse • Lawrence, Kansas	ESPN2		L 65–90	15–5 (4–3)
Sat, Feb 5	3 p.m.	Iowa State*	#20	Frank Erwin Center • Austin, Texas	ESPN Plus	13066	L 80–92 ^{OT}	15–6 (4–4)
Tue, Feb 8	8:30 p.m.	@ Colorado*	#23	Coors Events Center • Boulder, Colorado	FSNSW (Texas)/ FSNRM (CO)		L 79–88	15–7 (4–5)
Sat, Feb 12	12:45 p.m.	Kansas State*	#23	Frank Erwin Center • Austin, Texas	ESPN Plus	13355	W 75–72 ^{OT}	16–7 (5–5)
Wed, Feb 16	7 p.m.	Texas A&M*	—	Frank Erwin Center • Austin, Texas	FSNSW (Texas)	14018	W 75–40	17–7 (6–5)
Sat, Feb 19	8 p.m.	@ Baylor*	—	Ferrell Center • Waco, Texas	ESPN Plus		W 75–60	18–7 (7–5)
Tue, Feb 22	7 p.m.	@ Texas Tech*	—	United Spirit Arena • Lubbock, Texas	ESPN2		L 65–69	18–8 (7–6)
Sat, Feb 26	noon	Missouri*	—	Frank Erwin Center • Austin, Texas	ABC	13756	W 63–51	19–8 (8–6)
Mon, Feb 28	8 p.m.	#20 Oklahoma*	—	Frank Erwin Center • Austin, Texas	ESPN	15036	L 58–74	19–9 (8–7)
Sat, Mar 5	8 p.m.	@ #8 Oklahoma State*	—	Gallagher-Iba Arena • Stillwater, Oklahoma	ESPN		W 74–73	20–9 (9–7)
2005 Big 12 Conference tournament — No. 6 Seed
Thu, Mar 10	8:20 p.m.	vs. (11) Colorado*	—	Kemper Arena • Kansas City, Missouri (Big 12 Conference tournament First Round)	ESPNU/ ESPN Plus		L 69–81	20–10
2005 NCAA tournament — No. 8 Seed
Thu, Mar 17	6:10 p.m.	vs. (9) Nevada	—	RCA Dome • Indianapolis, Indiana (NCAA Tournament First Round)	CBS		L 57–61	20–11
*Big 12 Conference Game. ^{†}All times in Central Standard Time. ^{#}Rank according to Associated Press (AP) Poll. ^{OT} indicates overtime.

== 2005–06 season ==
=== Schedule and results ===
NCAA Elite Eight; Coach: Rick Barnes; Overall record: 30–7; Big 12 record: 13–3; Big 12 standing: T-1st; Final AP Poll: 9th Final ESPN/USA Today Coaches' Poll: 9th
Date	Time^{†}	Opponent^{#}	Rank^{#}	Site	TV	Home attendance	Result	Record
Exhibition games
Wed, Nov 2	7 p.m.	St. Mary's	#2	Frank Erwin Center • Austin, Texas			W 113–49	(1–0 exhib.)
Wed, Nov 9	7 p.m.	Lenoir-Rhyne	#2	Frank Erwin Center • Austin, Texas			W 97–36	(2–0 exhib.)
Regular season
Tue, Nov 15	7:30 p.m.	Southern	#2	Frank Erwin Center • Austin, Texas (Guardians Classic First Round)		10483	W 89–56	1–0
Wed, Nov 16	7:30 p.m.	Samford	#2	Frank Erwin Center • Austin, Texas (Guardians Classic Second Round)	ESPNU	9510	W 77–33	2–0
Mon, Nov 21	6 p.m.	vs. #13 West Virginia	#2	Municipal Auditorium • Kansas City, Missouri (Guardians Classic Semifinals)	ESPN2		W 76–75	3–0
Tue, Nov 22	9 p.m.	vs. #18 Iowa	#2	Municipal Auditorium • Kansas City, Missouri (Guardians Classic Championship Game)	ESPN2		W 68–59	4–0
Sat, Nov 26	5 p.m.	Louisiana-Monroe	#2	Frank Erwin Center • Austin, Texas	FSNSW (Texas)	11411	W 90–55	5–0
Tue, Nov 29	7 p.m.	Texas-Pan American	#2	Frank Erwin Center • Austin, Texas	FSNSW (Texas)	9340	W 82–54	6–0
Sat, Dec 3	5 p.m.	Texas-Arlington	#2	Frank Erwin Center • Austin, Texas	FSNSW (Texas)	10502	W 93–55	7–0
Mon, Dec 5	7 p.m.	@ Rice	#2	Toyota Center • Houston, Texas	FSNSW (Texas)		W 85–58	8–0
Sat, Dec 10	12:30 p.m.	vs. #1 Duke	#2	Continental Airlines Arena • East Rutherford, New Jersey	CBS		L 66–97	8–1
Sat, Dec 17	1 p.m.	Tennessee	#6	Frank Erwin Center • Austin, Texas	ESPN	13682	L 78–95	8–2
Thu, Dec 22	7 p.m.	Texas State	#15	Frank Erwin Center • Austin, Texas	FSNSW (Texas)	12373	W 85–49	9–2
Fri, Dec 30	7 p.m.	Prairie View A&M	#15	Frank Erwin Center • Austin, Texas	FSNSW (Texas)	10900	W 110–38	10–2
Mon, Jan 2	1:30 p.m.	@ #4 Memphis	#15	FedEx Forum • Memphis, Tennessee	ESPN		W 69–58	11–2
Sat, Jan 7	3 p.m.	Colorado*	#15	Frank Erwin Center • Austin, Texas	ESPN Plus	14168	W 89–64	12–2 (1–0 Big 12)
Mon, Jan 9	8 p.m.	@ Iowa State*	#8	Hilton Coliseum • Ames, Iowa	ESPN		W 78–58	13–2 (2–0)
Sat, Jan 14	noon	#3 Villanova	#8	Frank Erwin Center • Austin, Texas	CBS	16755	W 58–55	14–2
Tue, Jan 17	8 p.m.	Texas Tech*	#5	Frank Erwin Center • Austin, Texas	ESPN Plus	16312	W 80–46	15–2 (3–0)
Sat, Jan 21	3 p.m.	@ Baylor*	#5	Ferrell Center • Waco, Texas	ESPN Plus		W 66–47	16–2 (4–0)
Mon, Jan 23	7:05 p.m.	Oklahoma State*	#5	Frank Erwin Center • Austin, Texas	ESPN	14053	W 80–46	17–2 (5–0)
Sat, Jan 28	8 p.m.	@ #24 Oklahoma*	#4	Lloyd Noble Center • Norman, Oklahoma	ESPN2		L 72–82	17–3 (5–1)
Wed, Feb 1	8:05 p.m.	@ Missouri*	#7	Mizzou Arena • Columbia, Missouri	ESPN2		W 66–53	18–3 (6–1)
Sat, Feb 4	1 p.m.	Texas A&M*	#7	Frank Erwin Center • Austin, Texas	ESPN	16205	W 83–70	19–3 (7–1)
Mon, Feb 6	8 p.m.	@ Texas Tech*	#6	United Spirit Arena • Lubbock, Texas	ESPN2		W 65–44	20–3 (8–1)
Sat, Feb 11	3 p.m.	Nebraska*	#6	Frank Erwin Center • Austin, Texas	ESPN	13311	W 78–59	21–3 (9–1)
Tue, Feb 14	7 p.m.	Baylor*	#6	Frank Erwin Center • Austin, Texas	FSNSW (Texas)	10269	W 90–63	22–3 (10–1)
Sun, Feb 19	12:30 p.m.	@ Oklahoma State*	#6	Gallagher-Iba Arena • Stillwater, Oklahoma	ABC		L 60–81	22–4 (10–2)
Wed, Feb 22	7 p.m.	@ Kansas State*	#7	Bramlage Coliseum • Manhattan, Kansas	ESPN2		W 65–64	23–4 (11–2)
Sat, Feb 25	8 p.m.	#16 Kansas*	#7	Frank Erwin Center • Austin, Texas	ESPN	16755	W 80–55	24–4 (12–2)
Wed, Mar 1	7 p.m.	@ Texas A&M*	#6	Reed Arena • College Station, Texas	ESPN2		L 43–46	24–5 (12–3)
Sun, Mar 5	3 p.m.	#19 Oklahoma*	#6	Frank Erwin Center • Austin, Texas	CBS	15386	W 72–48	25–5 (13–3)
2006 Big 12 Conference tournament — No. 1 Seed
Fri, Mar 10	11:30 a.m.	vs. (8) Texas Tech*	#8	American Airlines Center • Dallas, Texas (Big 12 Conference tournament quarterfinals)	ESPNU/ ESPN Plus		W 77–70	26–5
Sat, Mar 11	1 p.m.	vs. (4) Texas A&M*	#8	American Airlines Center • Dallas, Texas (Big 12 Conference tournament semifinals)	ESPN2/ ESPN Plus		W 74–70	27–5
Sun, Mar 12	2 p.m.	vs. (2) #17 Kansas*	#8	American Airlines Center • Dallas, Texas (Big 12 Conference tournament finals)	ESPN		L 68–80	27–6
2006 NCAA tournament — No. 2 Seed
Fri, Mar 17	8:50 p.m.	vs. (15) Pennsylvania	#9	American Airlines Center • Dallas, Texas (NCAA Tournament First Round)	CBS		W 60–52	28–6
Sun, Mar 19	3:45 p.m.	vs. (10) North Carolina State	#9	American Airlines Center • Dallas, Texas (NCAA Tournament Second Round)	CBS		W 75–54	29–6
Thu, Mar 23	8:40 p.m.	vs. (6) #22 West Virginia	#9	Georgia Dome • Atlanta (NCAA Tournament Sweet Sixteen)	CBS		W 74–71	30–6
Sat, Mar 25	3:40 p.m.	vs. (4) #19 Louisiana State	#9	Georgia Dome • Atlanta, Georgia (NCAA Tournament Elite Eight)	CBS		L 60–70 ^{OT}	30–7
*Big 12 Conference Game. ^{†}All times in Central Standard Time. ^{#}Rank according to Associated Press (AP) Poll. ^{OT} indicates overtime.

== 2006–07 season ==
=== Schedule and results ===
NCAA Second Round; Coach: Rick Barnes; Overall record: 25–10; Big 12 record: 12–4; Big 12 standing: 3rd Final AP Poll: 11th Final ESPN/USA Today Coaches' Poll: 16th
Date	Time^{†}	Opponent^{#}	Rank^{#}	Site	TV	Home attendance	Result	Record
Exhibition games
Tue, Oct 31	7 p.m.	Lenoir-Rhyne	#21	Frank Erwin Center • Austin, Texas			W 98–64	(1–0 exhib.)
Mon, Nov 6	7 p.m.	Xavier (La.)	#21	Frank Erwin Center • Austin, Texas			W 103–53	(2–0 exhib.)
Regular season
Thu, Nov 9	8:30 p.m.	Alcorn State	#21	Frank Erwin Center • Austin, Texas (2K Sports College Hoops Classic Regional)	ESPNU	9623	W 103–44	1–0
Fri, Nov 10	8 p.m.	Chicago State	#21	Frank Erwin Center • Austin, Texas (2K Sports College Hoops Classic Regional)	ESPNU	9918	W 92–66	2–0
Thu, Nov 16	9:30 p.m.	vs. Michigan State	#19	Madison Square Garden • New York City (2K Sports College Hoops Classic Semifinal Game 2)	ESPN2		L 61–63	2–1
Fri, Nov 17	7 p.m.	vs. St. John's	#19	Madison Square Garden • New York (2K Sports College Hoops Classic Consolation Game)	ESPN2		W 77–76	3–1
Tue, Nov 21	7 p.m.	Nicholls State	—	Frank Erwin Center • Austin, Texas	FSNSW (Texas)	10474	W 91–60	4–1
Tue, Nov 28	7 p.m.	Texas Southern	—	Frank Erwin Center • Austin, Texas	FSNSW (Texas)	9690	W 90–50	5–1
Sat, Dec 2	1:10 p.m.	vs. Gonzaga	—	US Airways Center • Phoenix, Arizona	ESPN		L 77–87	5–2
Sun, Dec 10	7 p.m.	vs. #9 Louisiana; State	—	Toyota Center • Houston, Texas	ESPN		W 76–75 ^{OT}	6–2
Sat, Dec 16	3 p.m.	Texas State	—	Frank Erwin Center • Austin, Texas	FSNSW (Texas)	10754	W 96–70	7–2
Wed, Dec 20	8 p.m.	Arkansas	—	Frank Erwin Center • Austin, Texas	ESPN2	14451	W 80–76	8–2
Sat, Dec 23	noon	@ Tennessee	—	Thompson–Boling Arena • Knoxville, Tennessee	ESPN		L 105–111 ^{OT}	8–3
Thu, Dec 28	7 p.m.	Centenary	—	Frank Erwin Center • Austin, Texas	FSNSW (Texas)	10913	W 76–66	9–3
Tue, Jan 2	7 p.m.	Texas-Arlington	—	Frank Erwin Center • Austin, Texas	FSNSW (Texas)	9732	W 84–52	10–3
Sat, Jan 6	2:01 p.m.	@ Colorado*	—	Coors Events Center • Boulder, Colorado	ESPN Plus		W 102–78	11–3 (1–0 Big 12)
Wed, Jan 10	7 p.m.	Missouri*	#25	Frank Erwin Center • Austin, Texas	FSNSW (Texas)	11983	W 88–68	12–3 (2–0)
Sat, Jan 13	2:30 p.m.	Oklahoma*	#25	Frank Erwin Center • Austin, Texas	ABC	14935	W 80–69	13–3 (3–0)
Tue, Jan 16	8:05 p.m.	@ #12 Oklahoma State*	#21	Gallagher-Iba Arena • Stillwater, Oklahoma	ESPN2		L 103–105 ^{3OT}	13–4 (3–1)
Sat, Jan 20	1:37 p.m.	@ Villanova	#21	Wachovia Center • Philadelphia	CBS		L 69–76	13–5
Wed, Jan 24	7:05 p.m.	@ Nebraska*	—	Devaney Center • Lincoln, Nebraska	FSNMW/FSNSW		W 62–61	14–5 (4–1)
Sat, Jan 27	5 p.m.	Baylor*	—	Frank Erwin Center • Austin, Texas	ESPN2	15256	W 84–79	15–5 (5–1)
Wed, Jan 31	8 p.m.	@ Texas Tech*	#22	United Spirit Arena • Lubbock, Texas	ESPN2		W 76–64	16–5 (6–1)
Sat, Feb 3	2:30 p.m.	Kansas State*	#22	Frank Erwin Center • Austin, Texas	ABC	15709	L 72–73	16–6 (6–2)
Mon, Feb 5	8 p.m.	@ #6 Texas A&M*	—	Reed Arena • College Station, Texas	ESPN		L 82–100	16–7 (6–3)
Sat, Feb 10	12:47 p.m.	Iowa State*	—	Frank Erwin Center • Austin, Texas	ESPN Plus	14743	W 77–68	17–7 (7–3)
Mon, Feb 12	8 p.m.	#18 Oklahoma State*	—	Frank Erwin Center • Austin, Texas	ESPN	15815	W 83–54	18–7 (8–3)
Sat, Feb 17	7 p.m.	@ Baylor*	—	Ferrell Center • Waco, Texas	FSNSW (Texas)		W 68–67	19–7 (9–3)
Tue, Feb 20	8 p.m.	Texas Tech*	#19	Frank Erwin Center • Austin, Texas	ESPN Plus	16753	W 80–51	20–7 (10–3)
Sat, Feb 24	3 p.m.	@ Oklahoma*	#19	Lloyd Noble Center • Norman, Oklahoma	ESPNU/ ESPN Plus		W 68–58	21–7 (11–3)
Wed, Feb 28	8 p.m.	#7 Texas A&M*	#15	Frank Erwin Center • Austin, Texas	ESPN2	16755	W 98–96 ^{2OT}	22–7 (12–3)
Sat, Mar 3	11 a.m.	@ #3 Kansas*	#15	Allen Fieldhouse • Lawrence, Kansas	CBS		L 86–90	22–8 (12–4)
2007 Big 12 Conference tournament — No. 3 Seed
Fri, Mar 9	8:20 p.m.	vs. (11) Baylor*	#15	Ford Center • Oklahoma City, Oklahoma (Big 12 Conference tournament quarterfinals)	ESPN Plus		W 74–69	23–8
Sat, Mar 10	3:20 p.m.	vs. (7) Oklahoma State*	#15	Ford Center • Oklahoma City, Oklahoma (Big 12 Conference tournament semifinals)	ESPN2		W 69–64	24–8
Sun, Mar 11	2 p.m.	vs. (1) #2 Kansas*	#15	Ford Center • Oklahoma City, Oklahoma (Big 12 Conference tournament finals)	ESPN		L 84–88 ^{OT}	24–9
2007 NCAA tournament — No. 4 Seed
Fri, Mar 16	4:30 p.m.	vs. (13) New Mexico State	#11	Spokane Arena • Spokane, Washington (NCAA Tournament First Round)	CBS		W 79–67	25–9
Sun, Mar 18	2:15 p.m.	vs. (5) Southern California	#11	Spokane Arena • Spokane, Washington (NCAA Tournament Second Round)	CBS		L 68–87	25–10
*Big 12 Conference Game. ^{†}All times in Central Standard Time. ^{#}Rank according to Associated Press (AP) Poll. ^{OT} indicates overtime.

== 2007–08 season ==
=== Schedule and results ===
NCAA Elite Eight; Coach: Rick Barnes; Overall record: 31–7; Big 12 record: 13–3; Big 12 standing: t-1st Final AP Poll: 7th Final ESPN/USA Today Coaches' Poll: 5th
Date	Time^{†}	Opponent^{#}	Rank^{#}	Site	TV	Home attendance	Result	Record
Exhibition games
Fri, Nov 2	7 p.m.	Xavier (La.)	#15	Frank Erwin Center • Austin, Texas			W 87–56	(1–0 exhib.)
Regular season
Mon, Nov 12	7 p.m.	Texas-San Antonio	#16	Frank Erwin Center • Austin, Texas	FSNSW (Texas)	10840	W 58–37	1–0
Fri, Nov 16	7 p.m.	UC Davis	#16	Frank Erwin Center • Austin, Texas (StubHub! Legends Classic Regional Round)		10792	W 73–42	2–0
Sun, Nov 18	5 p.m.	Arkansas-Monticello	#16	Frank Erwin Center • Austin, Texas (StubHub! Legends Classic Regional Round)		10483	W 100–52	3–0
Fri, Nov 23	6 p.m.	vs. New Mexico State	#15	Prudential Center • Newark, New Jersey (StubHub! Legends Classic Semifinals)	Versus		W 102–87	4–0
Sat, Nov 24	6 p.m.	vs. #7 Tennessee	#15	Prudential Center • Newark, New Jersey (StubHub! Legends Classic Championship Game)	Versus		W 97–78	5–0
Wed, Nov 28	7 p.m.	Texas Southern	#8	Frank Erwin Center • Austin, Texas		10518	W 98–61	6–0
Sun, Dec 2	7 p.m.	@ #2 UCLA	#8	Pauley Pavilion • Los Angeles (Big 12/Pac-10 Hardwood Series)	Fox Sports Net		W 63–61	7–0
Wed, Dec 5	7 p.m.	North Texas	#4	Frank Erwin Center • Austin, Texas	FSNSW (Texas)	10913	W 88–72	8–0
Sat, Dec 8	7 p.m.	@ Rice	#4	Toyota Center • Houston	CSTV		W 80–54	9–0
Sat, Dec 15	5 p.m.	Texas State	#4	Frank Erwin Center • Austin, Texas	FSNSW (Texas)	12863	W 96–81	10–0
Tue, Dec 18	5:30 p.m.	Oral Roberts	#4	Frank Erwin Center • Austin, Texas	FSNSW (Texas)	11540	W 66–56	11–0
Sat, Dec 22	5:30 p.m.	vs. #9 Michigan State	#4	The Palace of Auburn Hills • Auburn Hills, Michigan (Dick's Sporting Goods Spartan Clash)	ESPN		L 72–78	11–1
Sat, Dec 29	11 a.m.	Wisconsin	#9	Frank Erwin Center • Austin, Texas	ESPN2	16438	L 66–67	11–2
Wed, Jan 2	4 p.m.	TCU	#14	Frank Erwin Center • Austin, Texas	FSNSW (Texas)	12157	W 67–59	12–2
Sat, Jan 5	5 p.m.	St. Mary's (California)	#14	Frank Erwin Center • Austin, Texas	FSNSW (Texas)	12525	W 81–62	13–2
Sat, Jan 12	12:45 p.m.	@ Missouri*	#12	Mizzou Arena • Columbia, Missouri	ESPN Plus		L 84–97	13–3 (0–1 Big 12)
Sat, Jan 19	7 p.m.	Colorado*	#19	Frank Erwin Center • Austin, Texas	ESPN Plus	16755	W 69–67	14–3 (1–1)
Mon, Jan 21	8 p.m.	@ Oklahoma State*	#12	Gallagher-Iba Arena • Stillwater, Oklahoma	ESPN		W 63–61	15–3 (2–1)
Sat, Jan 26	7 p.m.	Texas Tech*	#12	Frank Erwin Center • Austin, Texas	ESPN Plus	16755	W 73–47	16–3 (3–1)
Wed, Jan 30	8 p.m.	@ #23 Texas A&M*	#10	Reed Arena • College Station, Texas	ESPN2		L 63–80	16–4 (3–2)
Sat, Feb 2	12:45 p.m.	#25 Baylor*	#10	Frank Erwin Center • Austin, Texas	ESPN Plus	15458	W 80–72	17–4 (4–2)
Wed, Feb 6	6 p.m.	@ Oklahoma*	#12	Lloyd Noble Center • Norman, Oklahoma	ESPN2		W 64–54	18–4 (5–2)
Sat, Feb 9	2:30 p.m.	@ Iowa State*	#12	Hilton Coliseum • Ames, Iowa	ABC		W 71–65 ^{OT}	19–4 (6–2)
Mon, Feb 11	8 p.m.	#3 Kansas*	#11	Frank Erwin Center • Austin, Texas	ESPN	16755	W 72–69	20–4 (7–2)
Sat, Feb 16	5 p.m.	@ Baylor*	#11	Ferrell Center • Waco, Texas	ESPN		W 82–77	21–4 (8–2)
Mon, Feb 18	8 p.m.	#22 Texas A&M*	#7	Frank Erwin Center • Austin, Texas	ESPN	16755	W 77–50	22–4 (9–2)
Sat, Feb 23	2:30 p.m.	Oklahoma*	#7	Frank Erwin Center • Austin, Texas	ABC	16056	W 62–45	23–4 (10–2)
Mon, Feb 25	8 p.m.	@ Kansas State*	#5	Bramlage Coliseum • Manhattan, Kansas	ESPN		W 74–65	24–4 (11–2)
Sat, Mar 1	3 p.m.	@ Texas Tech*	#5	United Spirit Arena • Lubbock, Texas	CBS		L 80–83	24–5 (11–3)
Tue, Mar 4	6:30 p.m.	Nebraska*	#9	Frank Erwin Center • Austin, Texas	FSNSW (Texas)	14565	W 70–66	25–5 (12–3)
Sun, Mar 9	3 p.m.	Oklahoma State*	#9	Frank Erwin Center • Austin, Texas	ESPN	16505	W 62–57	26–5 (13–3)
2008 Big 12 Conference tournament — No. 1 Seed
Fri, Mar 14	11:30 a.m.	vs. (9) Oklahoma State*	#6	Sprint Center • Kansas City, Missouri (Big 12 Conference tournament quarterfinals)	ESPN Plus/ ESPNU		W 66–59	27–5
Sat, Mar 15	1 p.m.	vs. (4) Oklahoma*	#6	Sprint Center • Kansas City, Missouri (Big 12 Conference tournament semifinals)	ESPN Plus/ ESPN2		W 77–49	28–5
Sun, Mar 16	2 p.m.	vs. (2) #5 Kansas*	#6	Sprint Center • Kansas City, Missouri	ESPN		L 74–84	28–6
2008 NCAA tournament — No. 2 Seed
Fri, Mar 21	2 p.m.	vs. (15) Austin Peay	#7	Alltel Arena • Little Rock, Arkansas (NCAA Tournament First Round)	CBS		W 74–54	29–6
Sun, Mar 23	1:15 p.m.	vs. (7) Miami (FL)	#7	Alltel Arena • Little Rock, Arkansas (NCAA Tournament Second Round)	CBS		W 75–72	30–6
Fri, Mar 28	6:27 p.m.	vs. (3) #10 Stanford	#7	Reliant Stadium • Houston, Texas (NCAA Tournament Sweet Sixteen)	CBS		W 82–62	31–6
Sun, Mar 30	1:20 p.m.	vs. (1) #2 Memphis	#7	Reliant Stadium • Houston, Texas (NCAA Tournament Elite Eight)	CBS		L 67–85	31–7
*Big 12 Conference Game. ^{†}All times in Central Standard Time. ^{#}Rank according to Associated Press (AP) Poll. ^{OT} indicates overtime.
