= 2002 Big 12 men's basketball tournament =

- Classification: Division I
- Season: 2001–02
- Teams: 12
- Site: Kemper Arena; Kansas City, Missouri
- Champions: Oklahoma (2nd title)
- Winning coach: Kelvin Sampson (2nd title)
- MVP: Hollis Price (Oklahoma)
- Attendance: 104,740 (overall); 18,848 (championship)
- Top scorer: Drew Gooden (Kansas) (56 points)
- Television: ESPN

2001–02 Big 12 men's basketball standings
	Conf.				Overall
Team	W		L	PCT	W		L	PCT
No. 2 Kansas	16	–	0	1.000	33	–	4	.892
No. 3 Oklahoma †	13	–	3	.813	31	–	5	.861
Texas	10	–	6	.625	22	–	12	.647
No. 20 Oklahoma State	10	–	6	.625	23	–	9	.719
Texas Tech	10	–	6	.625	23	–	9	.719
Missouri	9	–	7	.563	24	–	12	.667
Kansas State	6	–	10	.375	13	–	16	.448
Nebraska	6	–	10	.375	13	–	15	.464
Colorado	5	–	11	.313	15	–	14	.517
Baylor	4	–	12	.250	14	–	16	.467
Iowa State	4	–	12	.250	12	–	19	.387
Texas A&M	3	–	13	.188	9	–	22	.290
† 2002 Big 12 Tournament winner Rankings from AP poll

The 2002 Big 12 Men's Basketball tournament took place in Kansas City, Missouri at Kemper Arena. Oklahoma defeated Kansas 64–55 to win their second Big 12 tournament championship.

== Seeding ==
The Tournament consisted of a 12 team single-elimination tournament with the top 4 seeds receiving a bye.

2002 Big 12 Men's Basketball Tournament seeds
Seed	School	Conf.	Over.	Tiebreaker
1	Kansas ‡#	16–0	33–4	
2	Oklahoma #	13–3	31–5	
3	Texas #	10–6	22–12	
4	Oklahoma State #	10–6	23–9	
5	Texas Tech	10–6	23–9	
6	Missouri	9–7	24–12	
7	Kansas State	6–10	13–16	
8	Nebraska	6–10	13–15	
9	Colorado	5–11	15–14	
10	Baylor	4–12	14–16	
11	Iowa State	4–12	12–19	
12	Texas A&M	3–13	9–22	
‡ – Big 12 Conference regular season champions, and tournament No. 1 seed. # – Received a single-bye in the conference tournament. Overall records include all games played in the Big 12 Conference tournament.

== Schedule ==
Session	Game	Time	Matchup	Television	Attendance
First Round – Thursday, March 7
1	1	12:00 PM	#9 Colorado 67 vs #8 Nebraska 60	Big 12	10,500
1	2	2:20 PM	#5 Texas Tech 80 vs #12 Texas A&M 71	Big 12	10,500
2	3	6:00 PM	#7 Kansas State 74 vs #10 Baylor 73 ^{OT}	Big 12	18,848
2	4	8:35 PM	#6 Missouri 79 vs #11 Iowa State 59	ESPN2	18,848
Quarterfinals – Friday, March 8
3	5	12:00 PM	#1 Kansas 102 vs #9 Colorado 73	Big 12	18,848
3	6	2:20 PM	#5 Texas Tech 73 vs #4 Oklahoma State 51	Big 12	18,848
4	7	6:00 PM	#2 Oklahoma 63 vs #7 Kansas State 52	Big 12	18,848
4	8	8:20 PM	#3 Texas 89 vs #6 Missouri 85	Big 12	18,848
Semifinals – Saturday, March 9
5	9	1:00 PM	#1 Kansas 90 vs #5 Texas Tech 50	Big 12	18,848
5	10	3:20 PM	#2 Oklahoma 67 vs #3 Texas 51	Big 12	18,848
Final – Sunday, March 10
6	11	2:00 PM	#2 Oklahoma 64 vs #1 Kansas 55	ESPN	18,848
Game times in CT. #-Rankings denote tournament seed

== Bracket ==
First Round; Thursday, March 3
8	Nebraska	60
9	Colorado	67
5	Texas Tech	80
12	Texas A&M	71
6	Missouri	79
11	Iowa St	59
7	Kansas St	74*
10	Baylor	73

Quarterfinals; Friday, March 8
9	Colorado	73
1	#1 Kansas	102
5	Texas Tech	73
4	#14 Oklahoma St	51
6	Missouri	85
3	Texas	89
2	#4 Oklahoma	63
7	Kansas St	52

Semifinals; Saturday, March 9
1	#1 Kansas	90
5	Texas Tech	50
3	Texas	51
2	#4 Oklahoma	67

Finals; Sunday, March 10
1	#1 Kansas	55
2	#4 Oklahoma	64

* Indicates overtime game

== All-Tournament Team ==
Most Outstanding Player – Hollis Price, Oklahoma

Player	Team	Position	Class
Hollis Price	Oklahoma	Jr.	G
Nick Collison	Kansas	Jr.	F
Drew Gooden	Kansas	Jr.	F
Aaron McGhee	Oklahoma	Sr.	F
T. J. Ford	Texas	Fr.	G

== See also ==
- 2002 Big 12 Conference women's basketball tournament
- 2002 NCAA Division I men's basketball tournament
- 2001–02 NCAA Division I men's basketball rankings
