= ACC–Big Ten Challenge =

NCAA men's college basketball series

ACC-Big Ten Challenge
- Conference: Big Ten Conference; Atlantic Coast Conference
- League: NCAA Division I
- Founded: 1999
- Folded: 2022
- Sports fielded: College basketball
- Last champion: ACC
- Most titles: ACC (13)
- Broadcasters: ESPN, ESPN2, ESPNU, ESPN+

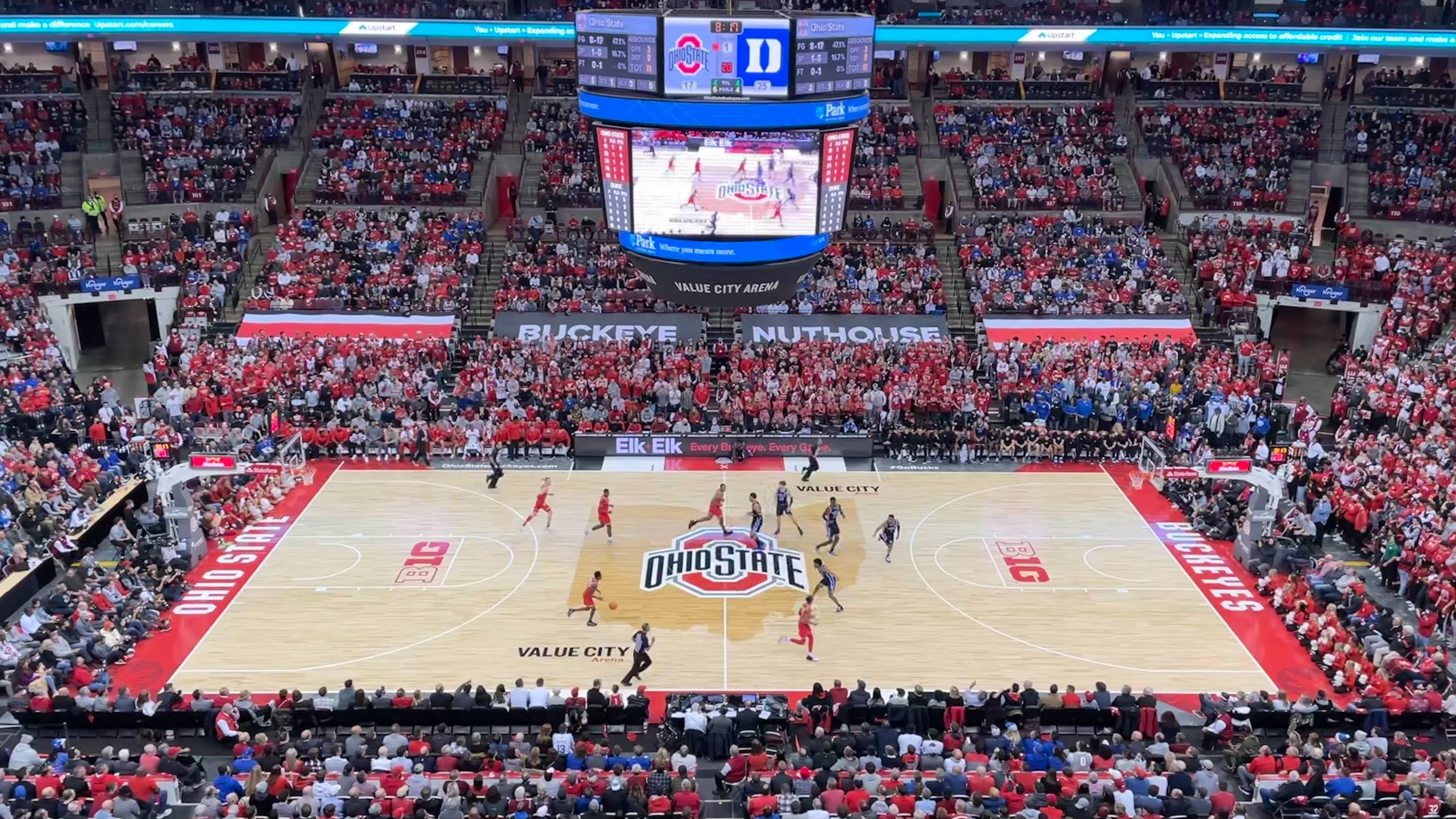
Duke vs. Ohio State in the 2021 ACC-Big Ten Challenge

The ACC–Big Ten Challenge (or Big Ten–ACC Challenge as it was called in alternating years) was an in-season NCAA Division I men's college basketball series that matched up teams from the Atlantic Coast Conference (ACC) and the Big Ten Conference (B1G). ESPN was a key part of the creation of the challenge and held the broadcast rights to all the games. The ACC–Big Ten Challenge occurred early in the non-conference season, typically around late November or early December. Each game was hosted by one of the participating schools, with teams typically alternating home and away status in each successive year. The event was played yearly from 1999 to 2022.

The ACC held an overall record of 13–8–3 in the series and 152–127 in the games. The ACC won each of the first 10 consecutive challenges, but the B1G won 8 of the last 14. In the 24 years of the event, 17 of the Challenges were decided by a single game or ended in a tie. Six of the other seven Challenges were won by the ACC by larger margins.

The popularity of the Challenge led other conferences to form similar partnerships in which their members go head-to-head against each other. Examples include the Big 12/Pac-10 Hardwood Series (2007–2010), SEC–Big East Challenge (2007–2012), Mountain West–Missouri Valley Challenge (2009–2018), Big 12/SEC Challenge (2013–2022), Big East–Big 12 Battle (2019–present) and the Gavitt Tipoff Games between the Big East and Big Ten (2015–2022). A sister series to the Challenge featuring women's basketball called the ACC–Big Ten Women's Challenge (2007–2022) was held for all but the first eight years.

The ACC initially played a short-lived interconference basketball series called the ACC–Big East Challenge (1989–1991), Big East coaches such as the late Georgetown coach John Thompson voted to end the ACC–Big East Challenge in 1991, which led to the ACC immediately looking to schedule a new series with the Big Ten as its preferred partner.

On November 28, 2022, amid ESPN losing its media rights to the Big Ten, it was announced that the series would be discontinued after the 2022–23 season. ESPN arranged an ACC–SEC Challenge as a replacement beginning in the 2023–24 season.

== Format ==
Typically, match-ups are selected for their expected interest in the game. Higher profile teams are chosen to play each other to enhance television ratings for ESPN. Minnesota and Florida State have had the most matches together, with six games. Seven other pairs of teams have faced each other five times in the Challenge.

With the exception of two years (2011–12), the imbalance of the number of teams in each conference result in up to three teams not playing. Nine games were scheduled for each of the first six challenges, leaving two teams from the 11-team Big Ten without an opponent. With the expansion of the ACC to 12 teams with the addition of Boston College, Miami, and Virginia Tech, the field was expanded to 11 games in 2006, meaning that one ACC team would not play. With Nebraska joining the Big Ten in 2011, the challenge expanded to 12 games and every member from both conferences participated. In 2013, Syracuse, Pittsburgh, and Notre Dame joined the ACC, leaving three ACC teams excluded from the competition. In 2014, Maryland withdrew from the ACC and joined the Big Ten along with Rutgers, giving that conference 14 teams, and Louisville joined the ACC replacing Maryland and maintaining the conference's 15-team membership. These conference realignments have led to the challenge being expanded to 14 games. When the challenge was expanded to 12 games, and later 14 games, the changes resulted in the possibility that the challenge could end in a tie. In the event of a tie, the previous year's winner retained the Commissioner's Cup. This scenario occurred when the ACC retained the Cup in 2018 based on its 11–3 win in 2017, while the Big Ten retained the Cup in both 2012 and 2013 based on its 8–4 win in 2011.

== Yearly results ==
| Year | Winner | ACC Wins | B1G Wins | Series |
|---|---|---|---|---|
| 2022 | ACC | 8 | 6 | ACC 13–8–3 |
| 2021 | B1G | 6 | 8 | ACC 12–8–3 |
| 2020 | B1G | 5 | 7 | ACC 12–7–3 |
| 2019 | B1G | 6 | 8 | ACC 12–6–3 |
| 2018 | Tie | 7 | 7 | ACC 12–5–3 |
| 2017 | ACC | 11 | 3 | ACC 12–5–2 |
| 2016 | ACC | 9 | 5 | ACC 11–5–2 |
| 2015 | B1G | 6 | 8 | ACC 10–5–2 |
| 2014 | B1G | 6 | 8 | ACC 10–4–2 |
| 2013 | Tie | 6 | 6 | ACC 10–3–2 |
| 2012 | Tie | 6 | 6 | ACC 10–3–1 |
| 2011 | B1G | 4 | 8 | ACC 10–3 |
| 2010 | B1G | 5 | 6 | ACC 10–2 |
| 2009 | B1G | 5 | 6 | ACC 10–1 |
| 2008 | ACC | 6 | 5 | ACC 10–0 |
| 2007 | ACC | 8 | 3 | ACC 9–0 |
| 2006 | ACC | 8 | 3 | ACC 8–0 |
| 2005 | ACC | 6 | 5 | ACC 7–0 |
| 2004 | ACC | 7 | 2 | ACC 6–0 |
| 2003 | ACC | 7 | 2 | ACC 5–0 |
| 2002 | ACC | 5 | 4 | ACC 4–0 |
| 2001 | ACC | 5 | 3 | ACC 3–0 |
| 2000 | ACC | 5 | 4 | ACC 2–0 |
| 1999 | ACC | 5 | 4 | ACC 1–0 |
| Overall | | 152 | 127 | N/A |

== Team records ==
The University of Maryland, College Park has a unique record in the Challenge, having competed for both sides after switching conferences in 2014. The Terrapins established a 10–5 record representing the ACC against Big Ten teams, but had just a 2–7 record representing the Big Ten against ACC teams. Maryland's overall record is 12–12 but is listed below according to its relevant conference affiliations.

=== Atlantic Coast Conference (13–8–3) ===
Duke was the most successful team in either conference in Challenge competition by a large margin, holding a 20–4 record. Two other ACC schools (Virginia and Wake Forest) won more games in the Challenge than any Big Ten school. Seven ACC schools overall had winning records while two others have a .500 record.

| Institution | Wins | Loss | Win Pct. | Out | Home wins | Home losses | Away wins | Away losses | Neutral wins | Neutral losses |
|---|---|---|---|---|---|---|---|---|---|---|
| Boston College Eagles | 7 | 7 | .500 | 4 | 4 | 3 | 3 | 4 | 0 | 0 |
| Clemson Tigers | 13 | 10 | .565 | 1 | 7 | 5 | 6 | 5 | 0 | 0 |
| Duke Blue Devils | 20 | 4 | .833 | 0 | 10 | 1 | 6 | 3 | 4 | 0 |
| Florida State Seminoles | 10 | 14 | .417 | 0 | 7 | 5 | 3 | 9 | 0 | 0 |
| Georgia Tech Yellow Jackets | 9 | 13 | .409 | 2 | 6 | 4 | 3 | 9 | 0 | 0 |
| Louisville Cardinals | 4 | 5 | .444 | 0 | 4 | 1 | 0 | 4 | 0 | 0 |
| Maryland Terrapins (1999–2013) | 10 | 5 | .667 | 0 | 5 | 1 | 4 | 2 | 1 | 2 |
| Miami Hurricanes | 10 | 6 | .625 | 3 | 6 | 2 | 4 | 4 | 0 | 0 |
| North Carolina Tar Heels | 11 | 13 | .458 | 0 | 6 | 5 | 3 | 8 | 2 | 0 |
| NC State Wolfpack | 9 | 12 | .429 | 1† | 8 | 3 | 1 | 9 | 0 | 0 |
| Notre Dame Fighting Irish | 5 | 5 | .500 | 0 | 4 | 1 | 1 | 4 | 0 | 0 |
| Pittsburgh Panthers | 5 | 4 | .556 | 1 | 2 | 2 | 3 | 2 | 0 | 0 |
| Syracuse Orange | 4 | 6 | .400 | 0 | 3 | 2 | 1 | 4 | 0 | 0 |
| Virginia Cavaliers | 14 | 8 | .636 | 0‡ | 7 | 3 | 7 | 5 | 0 | 0 |
| Virginia Tech Hokies | 7 | 9 | .438 | 3 | 4 | 4 | 3 | 5 | 0 | 0 |
| Wake Forest Demon Deacons | 14 | 6 | .700 | 4 | 8 | 2 | 6 | 4 | 0 | 0 |

- The column "Out" indicates the number of Challenges from which the team was excluded. This does not include cancellations.
- †North Carolina State has also had one game cancelled, in 2020.
- ‡Virginia has also had two games cancelled, in 2001 due to court conditions and in 2020.

=== Big Ten Conference (8–13–3) ===
Purdue (13–9) was the Big Ten team with the best record in the Challenge and the only Big Ten team with an overall winning record. Four schools had a .500 record.

| Institution | Wins | Loss | Win Pct. | Out | Home wins | Home losses | Away wins | Away losses | Neutral wins | Neutral losses |
|---|---|---|---|---|---|---|---|---|---|---|
| Illinois Fighting Illini | 11 | 13 | .458 | 0 | 7 | 4 | 4 | 6 | 0 | 3 |
| Indiana Hoosiers | 9 | 13 | .409 | 2 | 6 | 4 | 2 | 9 | 1 | 0 |
| Iowa Hawkeyes | 10 | 12 | .455 | 2 | 7 | 3 | 3 | 7 | 0 | 2 |
| Maryland Terrapins (2014 to 2022) | 2 | 7 | .222 | 0 | 1 | 4 | 1 | 3 | 0 | 0 |
| Michigan Wolverines | 8 | 13 | .381 | 2† | 5 | 5 | 3 | 8 | 0 | 0 |
| Michigan State Spartans | 9 | 13 | .409 | 0‡ | 8 | 3 | 1 | 9 | 0 | 1 |
| Minnesota Golden Gophers | 12 | 12 | .500 | 0 | 8 | 4 | 4 | 8 | 0 | 0 |
| Nebraska Cornhuskers | 6 | 6 | .500 | 0 | 3 | 3 | 3 | 3 | 0 | 0 |
| Northwestern Wildcats | 10 | 14 | .417 | 0 | 6 | 6 | 4 | 8 | 0 | 0 |
| Ohio State Buckeyes | 10 | 12 | .455 | 2 | 6 | 5 | 4 | 6 | 0 | 1 |
| Penn State Nittany Lions | 11 | 11 | .500 | 2 | 6 | 5 | 5 | 6 | 0 | 0 |
| Purdue Boilermakers | 13 | 9 | .591 | 2 | 9 | 2 | 4 | 7 | 0 | 0 |
| Rutgers Scarlet Knights | 4 | 5 | .444 | 0 | 2 | 2 | 2 | 3 | 0 | 0 |
| Wisconsin Badgers | 12 | 12 | .500 | 0 | 7 | 4 | 4 | 8 | 1 | 0 |

- The column "Out" indicates the number of Challenges from which the team was excluded. This does not include cancellations.
- †Michigan has also had one game cancelled, in 2020.
- ‡Michigan State has also had two games cancelled, in 2001 due to court conditions and in 2020.

== Results ==
=== 2022 ACC 8–6 ===
| Date | Time | ACC team | B1G team | Score | Location | Television | Attendance | Challenge leader |
|---|---|---|---|---|---|---|---|---|
| Nov 28 | 7:00 p.m. | **Virginia Tech** | Minnesota | 67–57 | Cassell Coliseum • Blacksburg, Virginia | ESPN2 | 7,870 | ACC 1–0 |
| Nov 28 | 9:00 p.m. | **Pittsburgh** | Northwestern | 87–58 | Welsh–Ryan Arena • Evanston, Illinois | ESPN2 | 2,606 | ACC 2–0 |
| Nov 29 | 7:00 p.m. | Louisville | No. 22 **Maryland** | 54–79 | KFC Yum! Center • Louisville, Kentucky | ESPN2 | 12,211 | ACC 2–1 |
| Nov 29 | 7:00 p.m. | **Clemson** | Penn State | 101–94^{2OT} | Littlejohn Coliseum • Clemson, South Carolina | ESPNU | 5,861 | ACC 3–1 |
| Nov 29 | 7:30 p.m. | Syracuse | No. 16 **Illinois** | 44–73 | State Farm Center • Champaign, Illinois | ESPN | 15,544 | ACC 3–2 |
| Nov 29 | 9:00 p.m. | **Wake Forest** | Wisconsin | 78–75 | Kohl Center • Madison, Wisconsin | ESPN2 | 14,435 | ACC 4–2 |
| Nov 29 | 9:00 p.m. | Georgia Tech | **Iowa** | 65–81 | Carver–Hawkeye Arena • Iowa City, Iowa | ESPNU | 10,450 | ACC 4–3 |
| Nov 29 | 9:30 p.m. | No. 3 **Virginia** | Michigan | 70–68 | Crisler Arena • Ann Arbor, Michigan | ESPN | 12,200 | ACC 5–3 |
| Nov 30 | 7:15 p.m. | No. 17 **Duke** | No. 25 Ohio State | 81–72 | Cameron Indoor Stadium • Durham, North Carolina | ESPN | 9,314 | ACC 6–3 |
| Nov 30 | 7:15 p.m. | Florida State | No. 5 **Purdue** | 69–79 | Donald L. Tucker Civic Center • Tallahassee, Florida | ESPN2 | 5,282 | ACC 6–4 |
| Nov 30 | 7:15 p.m. | **Miami (FL)** | Rutgers | 68–61 | Watsco Center • Coral Gables, Florida | ESPNU | 5,668 | ACC 7–4 |
| Nov 30 | 9:15 p.m. | No. 18 North Carolina | No. 10 **Indiana** | 65–77 | Simon Skjodt Assembly Hall • Bloomington, Indiana | ESPN | 17,222 | ACC 7–5 |
| Nov 30 | 9:15 p.m. | **Notre Dame** | No. 20 Michigan State | 70–52 | Joyce Center • South Bend, Indiana | ESPN2 | 7,854 | ACC 8–5 |
| Nov 30 | 9:15 p.m. | Boston College | **Nebraska** | 67–88 | Pinnacle Bank Arena • Lincoln, Nebraska | ESPNU | 13,080 | ACC 8–6 |
**Winners are in bold** Game times in EST; NC State did not play due to the ACC having one more team than the B1G.

=== 2021 Big Ten 8–6 ===
| Date | Time | ACC team | B1G team | Score | Location | Television | Attendance | Challenge leader |
|---|---|---|---|---|---|---|---|---|
| Nov 29 | 7:00 p.m. | Virginia | **Iowa** | 74–75 | John Paul Jones Arena • Charlottesville, Virginia | ESPN2 | 13,542 | B1G 1–0 |
| Nov 29 | 9:00 p.m. | Notre Dame | **Illinois** | 72–82 | State Farm Center • Champaign, Illinois | ESPN2 | 14,907 | B1G 2–0 |
| Nov 30 | 7:00 p.m. | **Syracuse** | Indiana | 112–110^{2OT} | Carrier Dome • Syracuse, New York | ESPN2 | 21,330 | B1G 2–1 |
| Nov 30 | 7:00 p.m. | Pittsburgh | **Minnesota** | 53–54 | Petersen Events Center • Pittsburgh, Pennsylvania | ESPNU | 7,736 | B1G 3–1 |
| Nov 30 | 7:30 p.m. | Florida State | No. 2 **Purdue** | 65–93 | Mackey Arena • West Lafayette, Indiana | ESPN | 14,804 | B1G 4–1 |
| Nov 30 | 9:00 p.m. | Clemson | **Rutgers** | 64–74 | Jersey Mike's Arena • Piscataway, New Jersey | ESPN2 | 8,050 | B1G 5–1 |
| Nov 30 | 9:00 p.m. | **Wake Forest** | Northwestern | 77–73 ^{OT} | LJVM Coliseum • Winston-Salem, North Carolina | ESPNU | 3,711 | B1G 5–2 |
| Nov 30 | 9:30 p.m. | No. 1 Duke | **Ohio State** | 66–71 | Value City Arena • Columbus, Ohio | ESPN | 18,809 | B1G 6–2 |
| Dec 1 | 7:15 p.m. | Louisville | No. 22 **Michigan State** | 64–73 | Breslin Center • East Lansing, Michigan | ESPN | 14,797 | B1G 7–2 |
| Dec 1 | 7:15 p.m. | **Virginia Tech** | Maryland | 62–58 | Xfinity Center • College Park, Maryland | ESPN2 | 15,988 | B1G 7–3 |
| Dec 1 | 7:15 p.m. | **NC State** | Nebraska | 104–100^{4OT} | PNC Arena • Raleigh, North Carolina | ESPNU | 19,722 | B1G 7–4 |
| Dec 1 | 9:15 p.m. | **North Carolina** | No. 24 Michigan | 72–51 | Dean Smith Center • Chapel Hill, North Carolina | ESPN | 19,938 | B1G 7–5 |
| Dec 1 | 9:15 p.m. | **Miami** | Penn State | 63–58 | Bryce Jordan Center • University Park, Pennsylvania | ESPNU | 8,221 | B1G 7–6 |
| Dec 1 | 9:15 p.m. | Georgia Tech | No. 23 **Wisconsin** | 66–70 | McCamish Pavilion • Atlanta, Georgia | ESPN2 | 6,302 | B1G 8–6 |
**Winners are in bold** Game times in EST; Boston College did not play due to the ACC having one more team than the B1G.

=== 2020 Big Ten 7–5 ===
| Date | Time | ACC team | B1G team | Score | Location | Television | Attendance | Challenge leader |
|---|---|---|---|---|---|---|---|---|
| Dec 8 | 5:00 p.m. | **Miami** | Purdue | 58–54 | Watsco Center • Coral Gables, Florida | ESPN2 | 0 | ACC 1–0 |
| Dec 8 | 7:00 p.m. | Boston College | **Minnesota** | 80–85^{OT} | Williams Arena • Minneapolis, Minnesota | ESPNU | 0 | Tied 1–1 |
| Dec 8 | 7:30 p.m. | No. 16 North Carolina | No. 3 **Iowa** | 80–93 | Carver–Hawkeye Arena • Iowa City, Iowa | ESPN | 583 | B1G 2–1 |
| Dec 8 | 7:30 p.m. | Notre Dame | No. 22 **Ohio State** | 85–90 | Edmund P. Joyce Center • South Bend, Indiana | ESPN2 | 156 | B1G 3–1 |
| Dec 8 | 9:00 p.m. | No. 15 Virginia Tech | **Penn State** | 55–75 | Cassell Coliseum • Blacksburg, Virginia | ESPNU | 250 | B1G 4–1 |
| Dec 8 | 9:30 p.m. | No. 10 Duke | No. 6 **Illinois** | 68–83 | Cameron Indoor Stadium • Durham, North Carolina | ESPN | 0 | B1G 5–1 |
| Dec 8 | 9:30 p.m. | Syracuse | No. 21 **Rutgers** | 69–79 | Rutgers Athletic Center • Piscataway, New Jersey | ESPN2 | 0 | B1G 6–1 |
| Dec 9 | 5:00 p.m. | **Clemson** | Maryland | 67–51 | Littlejohn Coliseum • Clemson, South Carolina | ESPN2 | 1,876 | B1G 6–2 |
| Dec 9 | ~~7:15 p.m.~~ | ~~NC State~~ | ~~Michigan~~ | Canceled | ~~Crisler Center • Ann Arbor, Michigan~~ | Canceled | Canceled | Canceled |
| Dec 9 | 7:15 p.m. | **Georgia Tech** | Nebraska | 75–64 | Pinnacle Bank Arena • Lincoln, Nebraska | ESPNU | 0 | B1G 6–3 |
| Dec 9 | 7:15 p.m. | No. 20 **Florida State** | Indiana | 69–67^{OT} | Donald L. Tucker Civic Center • Tallahassee, Florida | ESPN | 2,956 | B1G 6–4 |
| Dec 9 | ~~9:15 p.m.~~ | ~~No. 18 Virginia~~ | ~~No. 4 Michigan State~~ | Canceled | ~~John Paul Jones Arena • Charlottesville, Virginia~~ | Canceled | Canceled | Canceled |
| Dec 9 | 9:15 p.m. | **Pittsburgh** | Northwestern | 71–70 | Welsh-Ryan Arena • Evanston, Illinois | ESPNU | 0 | B1G 6–5 |
| Dec 19 | 12:00 p.m. | No. 23 Louisville | No. 12 **Wisconsin** | 48–85 | Kohl Center • Madison, Wisconsin | ESPN2 | 0 | B1G 7–5 |
**Winners are in bold** Game times in EST; Wake Forest did not play due to the ACC having one more team than the B1G. The NC State/Michigan, and Virginia/Michigan State games were canceled due to positive COVID-19 tests for NC State, and Virginia. The Louisville/Wisconsin game was postponed due to COVID-19 issues at Louisville, but the game was eventually played on December 19.

=== 2019 Big Ten 8–6 ===
| Date | Time | ACC team | B1G team | Score | Location | Television | Attendance | Challenge leader |
|---|---|---|---|---|---|---|---|---|
| Dec 2 | 7:00 pm | **Miami** | Illinois | 81–79 | State Farm Center • Champaign, Illinois | ESPN2 | 11,819 | ACC (1–0) |
| Dec 2 | 9:00 pm | Clemson | **Minnesota** | 78–60 | Williams Arena • Minneapolis, Minnesota | ESPN2 | 10,148 | Tied (1–1) |
| Dec 3 | 7:00 pm | Boston College | **Northwestern** | 82–64 | Conte Forum • Chestnut Hill, Massachusetts | ESPNU | 4,004 | B1G (2–1) |
| Dec 3 | 7:00 pm | Syracuse | **Iowa** | 68–54 | Carrier Dome • Syracuse, New York | ESPN2 | 20,844 | B1G (3–1) |
| Dec 3 | 7:30 pm | No. 1 **Louisville** | No. 4 Michigan | 58–43 | KFC Yum! Center • Louisville, Kentucky | ESPN | 21,674 | B1G (3–2) |
| Dec 3 | 9:00 pm | No. 17 Florida State | **Indiana** | 80–64 | Simon Skjodt Assembly Hall • Bloomington, Indiana | ESPN2 | 17,222 | B1G (4–2) |
| Dec 3 | 9:00 pm | **Pittsburgh** | Rutgers | 71–60 | Petersen Events Center • Pittsburgh, Pennsylvania | ESPNU | 7,894 | B1G (4–3) |
| Dec 3 | 9:30 pm | No. 10 **Duke** | No. 11 Michigan State | 87–75 | Breslin Center • East Lansing, Michigan | ESPN | 14,797 | Tied (4–4) |
| Dec 4 | 7:15 pm | No. 5 Virginia | **Purdue** | 69–40 | Mackey Arena • West Lafayette, Indiana | ESPN2 | 14,804 | B1G (5–4) |
| Dec 4 | 7:15 pm | **Georgia Tech** | Nebraska | 73–56 | McCamish Pavilion • Atlanta, Georgia | ESPNU | 5,133 | Tied (5–5) |
| Dec 4 | 7:30 pm | Notre Dame | No. 3 **Maryland** | 72–51 | Xfinity Center • College Park, Maryland | ESPN | 15,529 | B1G (6–5) |
| Dec 4 | 9:15 pm | **NC State** | Wisconsin | 69–54 | PNC Arena • Raleigh, North Carolina | ESPN2 | 16,035 | Tied (6–6) |
| Dec 4 | 9:15 pm | Wake Forest | **Penn State** | 76–54 | Bryce Jordan Center • University Park, Pennsylvania | ESPNU | 6,476 | B1G (7–6) |
| Dec 4 | 9:30 pm | No. 7 North Carolina | No. 6 **Ohio State** | 74–49 | Dean Smith Center • Chapel Hill, North Carolina | ESPN | 21,115 | B1G (8–6) |
**Winners are in bold** Game times in EST; Virginia Tech did not play due to the ACC having one more team than the B1G.

=== 2018 Tied 7–7 ===
| Date | Time | ACC team | B1G team | Score | Location | Television | Attendance | Challenge leader |
|---|---|---|---|---|---|---|---|---|
| Nov 26 | 7:00 pm | Clemson | **Nebraska** | 68–66 | Littlejohn Coliseum • Clemson, South Carolina | ESPN2 | 6,974 | B1G (1–0) |
| Nov 26 | 9:00 pm | **Boston College** | Minnesota | 68–56 | Conte Forum • Chestnut Hill, Massachusetts | ESPN2 | 4,389 | Tied (1–1) |
| Nov 27 | 7:00 pm | **Notre Dame** | Illinois | 76–74 | Edmund P. Joyce Center • South Bend, Indiana | ESPNU | 8,053 | ACC (2–1) |
| Nov 27 | 7:00 pm | No. 13 Virginia Tech | **Penn State** | 63–62 | Bryce Jordan Center • University Park, Pennsylvania | ESPN2 | 8,373 | Tied (2–2) |
| Nov 27 | 7:30 pm | **Louisville** | No. 9 Michigan State | 82–78 ^{OT} | KFC Yum! Center • Louisville, Kentucky | ESPN | 15,477 | ACC (3–2) |
| Nov 27 | 9:00 pm | NC State | No. 22 **Wisconsin** | 79–75 | Kohl Center • Madison, Wisconsin | ESPN2 | 17,012 | Tied (3–3) |
| Nov 27 | 9:00 pm | Pittsburgh | No. 14 **Iowa** | 69–68 | Carver–Hawkeye Arena • Iowa City, Iowa | ESPNU | 10,158 | B1G (4–3) |
| Nov 27 | 9:30 pm | No. 3 **Duke** | Indiana | 90–69 | Cameron Indoor Stadium • Durham, North Carolina | ESPN | 9,314 | Tied (4–4) |
| Nov 28 | 7:00 pm | Miami | **Rutgers** | 57–54 | Watsco Center • Coral Gables, Florida | ESPNU | 6,376 | B1G (5–4) |
| Nov 28 | 7:00 pm | **Syracuse** | No. 16 Ohio State | 72–62 | Value City Arena • Columbus, Ohio | ESPN2 | 16,962 | Tied (5–5) |
| Nov 28 | 7:30 pm | No. 4 **Virginia** | No. 24 Maryland | 76–71 | Xfinity Center • College Park, Maryland | ESPN | 17,950 | ACC (6–5) |
| Nov 28 | 9:15 pm | No. 15 **Florida State** | No. 19 Purdue | 73–72 | Donald L. Tucker Civic Center • Tallahassee, Florida | ESPN2 | 9,978 | ACC (7–5) |
| Nov 28 | 9:15 pm | Georgia Tech | **Northwestern** | 67–61 | Welsh-Ryan Arena • Evanston, Illinois | ESPNU | 6,378 | ACC (7–6) |
| Nov 28 | 9:30 pm | No. 11 North Carolina | No. 7 **Michigan** | 84–67 | Crisler Center • Ann Arbor, Michigan | ESPN | 12,707 | Tied (7–7) |
**Winners are in bold** Game times in EST; Wake Forest did not play due to the ACC having one more team than the B1G.

=== 2017 ACC 11–3 ===
| Date | Time | ACC team | B1G team | Score | Location | Television | Attendance | Challenge leader |
|---|---|---|---|---|---|---|---|---|
| Nov 27 | 7:00 pm | **Syracuse** | Maryland | 72–70 | Carrier Dome • Syracuse, New York | ESPN2 | 20,852 | ACC (1–0) |
| Nov 27 | 9:00 pm | No. 18 **Virginia** | Wisconsin | 49–37 | John Paul Jones Arena • Charlottesville, Virginia | ESPN2 | 13,911 | ACC (2–0) |
| Nov 28 | 7:00 pm | **Florida State** | Rutgers | 78–73 | Louis Brown Athletic Center • Piscataway, New Jersey | ESPNU | 4,853 | ACC (3–0) |
| Nov 28 | 7:15 pm | **Georgia Tech** | Northwestern | 52–51 | McCamish Pavilion • Atlanta, Georgia | ESPN2 | 5,562 | ACC (4–0) |
| Nov 28 | 8:00 pm | No. 17 Louisville | **Purdue** | 66–57 | Mackey Arena • West Lafayette, Indiana | ESPN | 14,804 | ACC (4–1) |
| Nov 28 | 9:00 pm | **Wake Forest** | Illinois | 80–73 | LJVM Coliseum • Winston-Salem, North Carolina | ESPN2 | 5,782 | ACC (5–1) |
| Nov 28 | 9:15 pm | **Virginia Tech** | Iowa | 79–55 | Cassell Coliseum • Blacksburg, Virginia | ESPNU | 7,101 | ACC (6–1) |
| Nov 29 | 7:15 pm | **Clemson** | Ohio State | 79–65 | Value City Arena • Columbus, Ohio | ESPN2 | 17,189 | ACC (7–1) |
| Nov 29 | 7:15 pm | **NC State** | Penn State | 85–78 | PNC Arena • Raleigh, North Carolina | ESPNU | 15,270 | ACC (8–1) |
| Nov 29 | 7:30 pm | No. 13 **North Carolina** | Michigan | 86–71 | Dean Smith Center • Chapel Hill, North Carolina | ESPN | 19,036 | ACC (9–1) |
| Nov 29 | 9:00 pm | No. 10 **Miami** | No. 12 Minnesota | 86–81 | Williams Arena • Minneapolis, Minnesota | ESPN2 | 14,625 | ACC (10–1) |
| Nov 29 | 9:15 pm | Boston College | **Nebraska** | 71–62 | Pinnacle Bank Arena • Lincoln, Nebraska | ESPNU | 10,742 | ACC (10–2) |
| Nov 29 | 9:30 pm | No. 1 **Duke** | Indiana | 91–81 | Simon Skjodt Assembly Hall • Bloomington, Indiana | ESPN | 17,222 | ACC (11–2) |
| Nov 30 | 7:00 pm | No. 5 Notre Dame | No. 3 **Michigan State** | 81–63 | Breslin Center • East Lansing, Michigan | ESPN | 14,797 | ACC (11–3) |
**Winners are in bold** Game times in EST. Rankings from AP Poll (Nov 27). Pittsburgh did not play due to the ACC having one more team than the B1G.

=== 2016 ACC 9–5 ===
| Date | Time | ACC team | B1G team | Score | Location | Television | Attendance | Challenge leader |
|---|---|---|---|---|---|---|---|---|
| Nov 28 | 7:00 pm | **Florida State** | Minnesota | 75–67 | Donald L. Tucker Civic Center • Tallahassee, Florida | ESPNU | 5,993 | ACC (1–0) |
| Nov 28 | 9:00 pm | Wake Forest | **Northwestern** | 65–58 | Welsh-Ryan Arena • Evanston, Illinois | ESPNU | 6,386 | Tied (1–1) |
| Nov 29 | 7:00 pm | **Pittsburgh** | Maryland | 73–59 | Xfinity Center • College Park, Maryland | ESPN2 | 17,144 | ACC (2–1) |
| Nov 29 | 7:00 pm | Georgia Tech | **Penn State** | 67–60 | Bryce Jordan Center • University Park, Pennsylvania | ESPNU | 6,032 | Tied (2–2) |
| Nov 29 | 7:30 pm | No. 22 Syracuse | No. 17 **Wisconsin** | 77–60 | Kohl Center • Madison, Wisconsin | ESPN | 17,287 | B1G (3–2) |
| Nov 29 | 9:00 pm | **Notre Dame** | Iowa | 92–78 | Edmund P. Joyce Center • Notre Dame, Indiana | ESPN2 | 7,660 | Tied (3–3) |
| Nov 29 | 9:00 pm | NC State | **Illinois** | 88–74 | State Farm Center • Champaign, Illinois | ESPNU | 13,481 | B1G (4–3) |
| Nov 29 | 9:30 pm | No. 5 **Duke** | Michigan State | 78–69 | Cameron Indoor Stadium • Durham, North Carolina | ESPN | 9,314 | Tied (4–4) |
| Nov 30 | 7:00 pm | No. 14 **Louisville** | No. 15 Purdue | 71–64 | KFC Yum! Center • Louisville, Kentucky | ESPN | 21,841 | ACC (5–4) |
| Nov 30 | 7:00 pm | **Virginia Tech** | Michigan | 73–70 | Crisler Center • Ann Arbor, Michigan | ESPN2 | 9,981 | ACC (6–4) |
| Nov 30 | 7:00 pm | **Miami** | Rutgers | 73–61 | Watsco Center • Coral Gables, Florida | ESPNU | 7,064 | ACC (7–4) |
| Nov 30 | 9:00 pm | **Clemson** | Nebraska | 60–58 | Littlejohn Coliseum • Clemson, South Carolina | ESPNU | 6,545 | ACC (8–4) |
| Nov 30 | 9:00 pm | No. 6 **Virginia** | Ohio State | 63–61 | John Paul Jones Arena • Charlottesville, Virginia | ESPN2 | 14,566 | ACC (9–4) |
| Nov 30 | 9:00 pm | No. 3 North Carolina | No. 13 **Indiana** | 76–67 | Simon Skjodt Assembly Hall • Bloomington, Indiana | ESPN | 17,222 | ACC (9–5) |
**Winners are in bold** Game times in EST. Rankings from AP Poll (Nov 28). Boston College did not play due to the ACC having one more team than the B1G.

=== 2015 Big Ten 8–6 ===
| Date | Time | ACC team | B1G team | Score | Location | Television | Attendance | Challenge leader |
|---|---|---|---|---|---|---|---|---|
| Nov 30 | 7:00 pm | **Wake Forest** | Rutgers | 69–68 | Louis Brown Athletic Center • Piscataway, New Jersey | ESPNU | 3,817 | ACC (1–0) |
| Nov 30 | 9:00 pm | Clemson | **Minnesota** | 89–83 | Williams Arena • Minneapolis, Minnesota | ESPN2 | 10,229 | Tied (1–1) |
| Dec 1 | 7:00 pm | NC State | **Michigan** | 66–59 | PNC Arena • Raleigh, North Carolina | ESPN2 | 17,645 | B1G (2–1) |
| Dec 1 | 7:00 pm | Virginia Tech | **Northwestern** | 81–79^{OT} | Cassell Coliseum • Blacksburg, Virginia | ESPNU | 4,879 | B1G (3–1) |
| Dec 1 | 7:30 pm | No. 10 **Virginia** | Ohio State | 64–58 | Value City Arena • Columbus, Ohio | ESPN | 12,445 | B1G (3–2) |
| Dec 1 | 9:00 pm | No. 21 **Miami** | Nebraska | 77–72^{OT} | Pinnacle Bank Arena • Lincoln, Nebraska | ESPNU | 15,646 | Tied (3–3) |
| Dec 1 | 9:00 pm | Pittsburgh | No. 11 **Purdue** | 72–59 | Petersen Events Center • Pittsburgh, Pennsylvania | ESPN2 | 9,439 | B1G (4–3) |
| Dec 1 | 9:30 pm | No. 9 **North Carolina** | No. 2 Maryland | 89–81 | Dean Smith Center • Chapel Hill, North Carolina | ESPN | 21,163 | Tied (4–4) |
| Dec 2 | 7:15 pm | No. 24 Louisville | No. 3 **Michigan State** | 71–67 | Breslin Center • East Lansing, Michigan | ESPN | 14,797 | B1G (5–4) |
| Dec 2 | 7:15 pm | No. 14 Syracuse | **Wisconsin** | 66–58^{OT} | Carrier Dome • Syracuse, New York | ESPN2 | 22,360 | B1G (6–4) |
| Dec 2 | 7:15 pm | Boston College | **Penn State** | 67–58 | Conte Forum • Chestnut Hill, Massachusetts | ESPNU | 2,165 | B1G (7–4) |
| Dec 2 | 9:15 pm | No. 7 **Duke** | Indiana | 94–74 | Cameron Indoor Stadium • Durham, North Carolina | ESPN | 9,314 | B1G (7–5) |
| Dec 2 | 9:15 pm | **Notre Dame** | Illinois | 84–79 | State Farm Center • Champaign, Illinois | ESPN2 | 14,953 | B1G (7–6) |
| Dec 2 | 9:15 pm | Florida State | **Iowa** | 78–75^{OT} | Carver–Hawkeye Arena • Iowa City, Iowa | ESPNU | 11,247 | B1G (8–6) |
**Winners are in bold** Game times in EST. Rankings from AP Poll (Nov 30). Georgia Tech did not play due to the ACC having one more team than the B1G.

=== 2014 Big Ten 8–6 ===
| Date | Time | ACC team | B1G team | Score | Location | Television | Attendance | Challenge leader |
|---|---|---|---|---|---|---|---|---|
| Dec 1 | 7:00 pm | Florida State | **Nebraska** | 70–65 | Donald L. Tucker Center • Tallahassee, Florida | ESPN2 | 6,406 | B1G (1–0) |
| Dec 1 | 7:00 pm | Clemson | **Rutgers** | 69–64 | Littlejohn Coliseum • Clemson, South Carolina | ESPNU | 6,285 | B1G (2–0) |
| Dec 2 | 7:00 pm | Pittsburgh | **Indiana** | 81–69 | Assembly Hall • Bloomington, Indiana | ESPN2 | 17,472 | B1G (3–0) |
| Dec 2 | 7:00 pm | Wake Forest | **Minnesota** | 84–69 | LJVM Coliseum • Winston-Salem, North Carolina | ESPNU | 8,112 | B1G (4–0) |
| Dec 2 | 7:30 pm | Syracuse | No. 17 **Michigan** | 68–65 | Crisler Center • Ann Arbor, Michigan | ESPN | 12,707 | B1G (5–0) |
| Dec 2 | 9:00 pm | No. 15 **Miami** | No. 24 Illinois | 70–61 | BankUnited Center • Coral Gables, Florida | ESPN2 | 6,086 | B1G (5–1) |
| Dec 2 | 9:00 pm | NC State | **Purdue** | 66–61 | Mackey Arena • West Lafayette, Indiana | ESPNU | 12,023 | B1G (6–1) |
| Dec 2 | 9:30 pm | No. 5 **Louisville** | No. 14 Ohio State | 64–55 | KFC Yum! Center • Louisville, Kentucky | ESPN | 22,784 | B1G (6–2) |
| Dec 3 | 7:15 pm | **Notre Dame** | No. 19 Michigan State | 79–78^{OT} | Edmund P. Joyce Center • South Bend, Indiana | ESPN2 | 9,149 | B1G (6–3) |
| Dec 3 | 7:15 pm | Virginia Tech | **Penn State** | 61–58 | Bryce Jordan Center • University Park, Pennsylvania | ESPNU | 7,326 | B1G (7–3) |
| Dec 3 | 7:30 pm | No. 12 North Carolina | **Iowa** | 60–55 | Dean Smith Center • Chapel Hill, North Carolina | ESPN | 18,040 | B1G (8–3) |
| Dec 3 | 9:15 pm | No. 7 **Virginia** | No. 21 Maryland | 76–65 | Xfinity Center • College Park, Maryland | ESPN2 | 15,371 | B1G (8–4) |
| Dec 3 | 9:15 pm | **Georgia Tech** | Northwestern | 66–58 | Welsh-Ryan Arena • Evanston, Illinois | ESPNU | 6,133 | B1G (8–5) |
| Dec 3 | 9:30 pm | No. 4 **Duke** | No. 2 Wisconsin | 80–70 | Kohl Center • Madison, Wisconsin | ESPN | 17,279 | B1G (8–6) |
**Winners are in bold** Game times in EST. Rankings from AP Poll (Dec 1). Challenge expanded to 14 games with the addition of Maryland and Rutgers to the B1G. Rutgers and Louisville made their inaugural appearances in the event. Boston College did not play due to the ACC having one more team than the B1G. First Challenge in which Maryland represented the B1G, as they left the ACC following the 2013–14 season.

=== 2013 Tied 6–6 ===
| Date | Time | ACC team | B1G team | Score | Location | Television | Attendance | Challenge leader |
|---|---|---|---|---|---|---|---|---|
| Dec 3 | 7:15 pm | No. 4 **Syracuse** | Indiana | 69–52 | Carrier Dome • Syracuse, New York | ESPN | 26,414 | ACC (1–0) |
| Dec 3 | 7:15 pm | **Georgia Tech** | Illinois | 67–64 | Hank McCamish Pavilion • Atlanta, Georgia | ESPN2 | 6,516 | ACC (2–0) |
| Dec 3 | 7:30 pm | **Pittsburgh** | Penn State | 78–69 | Petersen Events Center • Pittsburgh | ESPNU | 12,510 | ACC (3–0) |
| Dec 3 | 9:15 pm | No. 10 **Duke** | No. 22 Michigan | 79–69 | Cameron Indoor Stadium • Durham, North Carolina | ESPN | 9,314 | ACC (4–0) |
| Dec 3 | 9:15 pm | Notre Dame | No. 23 **Iowa** | 98–93 | Carver–Hawkeye Arena • Iowa City, Iowa | ESPN2 | 15,400 | ACC (4–1) |
| Dec 3 | 9:30 pm | Florida State | **Minnesota** | 71–61 | Williams Arena • Minneapolis, Minnesota | ESPNU | 11,386 | ACC (4–2) |
| Dec 4 | 7:00 pm | Maryland | No. 5 **Ohio State** | 76–60 | Value City Arena • Columbus, Ohio | ESPN | 16,206 | ACC (4–3) |
| Dec 4 | 7:00 pm | Virginia | No. 8 **Wisconsin** | 48–38 | John Paul Jones Arena • Charlottesville, Virginia | ESPN2 | 11,142 | Tied (4–4) |
| Dec 4 | 7:30 pm | **NC State** | Northwestern | 69–48 | PNC Arena • Raleigh, North Carolina | ESPNU | 11,459 | ACC (5–4) |
| Dec 4 | 9:00 pm | **North Carolina** | No. 1 Michigan State | 79–65 | Breslin Student Events Center • East Lansing, Michigan | ESPN | 14,797 | ACC (6–4) |
| Dec 4 | 9:30 pm | Boston College | **Purdue** | 88–67 | Mackey Arena • West Lafayette, Indiana | ESPN2 | 12,926 | ACC (6–5) |
| Dec 4 | 9:30 pm | Miami | **Nebraska** | 60–49 | Pinnacle Bank Arena • Lincoln, Nebraska | ESPNU | 15,088 | Tied (6–6) |
**Winners are in bold** Game times in EST. Rankings from AP Poll (Dec 2). Notre Dame, Pittsburgh, and Syracuse made their inaugural appearances in the event. Clemson, Virginia Tech, and Wake Forest did not play due to the ACC having three more teams than the B1G. Last Challenge in which Maryland represented the ACC, as they joined the B1G following the season.

=== 2012 Tied 6–6 ===
| Date | Time | ACC team | B1G team | Score | Location | Television | Attendance | Challenge leader |
|---|---|---|---|---|---|---|---|---|
| Nov 27 | 7:15 pm | **Virginia Tech** | Iowa | 95–79 | Cassell Coliseum • Blacksburg, Virginia | ESPNU | 5,647 | ACC (1–0) |
| Nov 27 | 7:15 pm | Florida State | No. 21 **Minnesota** | 77–68 | Donald L. Tucker Center • Tallahassee, Florida | ESPN2 | 7,941 | Tied (1–1) |
| Nov 27 | 7:30 pm | No. 18 NC State | No. 3 **Michigan** | 79–72 | Crisler Center • Ann Arbor, Michigan | ESPN | 12,693 | B1G (2–1) |
| Nov 27 | 9:15 pm | Wake Forest | **Nebraska** | 79–63 | LJVM Coliseum • Winston-Salem, North Carolina | ESPNU | 6,508 | B1G (3–1) |
| Nov 27 | 9:15 pm | **Maryland** | Northwestern | 77–57 | Welsh-Ryan Arena • Evanston, Illinois | ESPN2 | 6,009 | B1G (3–2) |
| Nov 27 | 9:30 pm | No. 14 North Carolina | No. 1 **Indiana** | 83–59 | Assembly Hall • Bloomington, Indiana | ESPN | 17,472 | B1G (4–2) |
| Nov 28 | 7:00 pm | **Virginia** | Wisconsin | 60–54 | Kohl Center • Madison, Wisconsin | ESPN2 | 16,690 | B1G (4–3) |
| Nov 28 | 7:15 pm | Clemson | **Purdue** | 73–61 | Littlejohn Coliseum • Clemson, South Carolina | ESPNU | 7,632 | B1G (5–3) |
| Nov 28 | 7:30 pm | **Miami** | No. 13 Michigan State | 67–59 | BankUnited Center • Coral Gables, Florida | ESPN | 5,791 | B1G (5–4) |
| Nov 28 | 9:00 pm | Georgia Tech | No. 22 **Illinois** | 75–62 | Assembly Hall • Champaign, Illinois | ESPN2 | 12,224 | B1G (6–4) |
| Nov 28 | 9:15 pm | **Boston College** | Penn State | 73–61 | Bryce Jordan Center • University Park, Pennsylvania | ESPNU | 6,889 | B1G (6–5) |
| Nov 28 | 9:30 pm | No. 2 **Duke** | No. 4 Ohio State | 73–68 | Cameron Indoor Stadium • Durham, North Carolina | ESPN | 9,314 | Tied (6–6) |
**Winners are in bold** Game times in EST. Rankings from AP Poll (Nov 26).

=== 2011 Big Ten 8–4 ===
| Date | Time | ACC team | B1G team | Score | Location | Television | Attendance | Challenge leader |
|---|---|---|---|---|---|---|---|---|
| Nov 29 | 7:00 pm | **Virginia** | No. 14 Michigan | 70–58 | John Paul Jones Arena • Charlottesville, Virginia | ESPN2 | 10,564 | ACC (1–0) |
| Nov 29 | 7:15 pm | Georgia Tech | **Northwestern** | 76–60 | Philips Arena • Atlanta, Georgia | ESPNU | 5,619 | Tied (1–1) |
| Nov 29 | 7:30 pm | Maryland | **Illinois** | 71–62 | Comcast Center • College Park, Maryland | ESPN | 13,187 | B1G (2–1) |
| Nov 29 | 9:00 pm | Miami | **Purdue** | 76–65 | Mackey Arena • West Lafayette, Indiana | ESPN2 | 13,927 | B1G (3–1) |
| Nov 29 | 9:15 pm | **Clemson** | Iowa | 71–55 | Carver–Hawkeye Arena • Iowa City, Iowa | ESPNU | 10,449 | B1G (3–2) |
| Nov 29 | 9:30 pm | No. 3 Duke | No. 2 **Ohio State** | 85–63 | Value City Arena • Columbus, Ohio | ESPN | 18,809 | B1G (4–2) |
| Nov 30 | 7:15 pm | NC State | **Indiana** | 86–75 | RBC Center • Raleigh, North Carolina | ESPN2 | 16,597 | B1G (5–2) |
| Nov 30 | 7:15 pm | Boston College | **Penn State** | 62–54 | Conte Forum • Chestnut Hill, Massachusetts | ESPNU | 4,326 | B1G (6–2) |
| Nov 30 | 7:30 pm | Florida State | **Michigan State** | 65–49 | Breslin Student Events Center • East Lansing, Michigan | ESPN | 14,797 | B1G (7–2) |
| Nov 30 | 9:15 pm | Virginia Tech | **Minnesota** | 58–55 | Williams Arena • Minneapolis, Minnesota | ESPN2 | 10,487 | B1G (8–2) |
| Nov 30 | 9:15 pm | **Wake Forest** | Nebraska | 55–53 | Bob Devaney Sports Center • Lincoln, Nebraska | ESPNU | 9,769 | B1G (8–3) |
| Nov 30 | 9:30 pm | No. 5 **North Carolina** | No. 9 Wisconsin | 60–57 | Dean Smith Center • Chapel Hill, North Carolina | ESPN | 21,750 | B1G (8–4) |
**Winners are in bold** Game times in EST. Rankings from AP Poll (Nov 28). Nebraska made its inaugural appearance in the event.

=== 2010 Big Ten 6–5 ===
| Date | Time | ACC team | B1G team | Score | Location | Television | Attendance | Challenge leader |
|---|---|---|---|---|---|---|---|---|
| Nov 29 | 7:00 pm | **Virginia** | No. 15 Minnesota | 87–79 | Williams Arena • Minneapolis, Minnesota | ESPN2 | 12,089 | ACC (1–0) |
| Nov 30 | 7:00 pm | **Wake Forest** | Iowa | 76–73 | LJVM Coliseum • Winston-Salem, North Carolina | ESPNU | 9,086 | ACC (2–0) |
| Nov 30 | 7:00 pm | Georgia Tech | **Northwestern** | 91–71 | Welsh-Ryan Arena • Evanston, Illinois | ESPN2 | 4,455 | ACC (2–1) |
| Nov 30 | 7:30 pm | Florida State | No. 2 **Ohio State** | 58–44 | Donald L. Tucker Center • Tallahassee, Florida | ESPN | 10,457 | Tied (2–2) |
| Nov 30 | 9:00 pm | Clemson | **Michigan** | 69–61 | Littlejohn Coliseum • Clemson, South Carolina | ESPN2 | 7,237 | B1G (3–2) |
| Nov 30 | 9:30 pm | North Carolina | No. 20 **Illinois** | 79–67 | Assembly Hall • Champaign, Illinois | ESPN | 16,618 | B1G (4–2) |
| Dec 1 | 7:15 pm | **Boston College** | Indiana | 88–76 | Conte Forum • Chestnut Hill, Massachusetts | ESPNU | 5,329 | B1G (4–3) |
| Dec 1 | 7:15 pm | NC State | **Wisconsin** | 87–48 | Kohl Center • Madison, Wisconsin | ESPN2 | 17,230 | B1G (5–3) |
| Dec 1 | 7:30 pm | Virginia Tech | No. 22 **Purdue** | 58–55^{OT} | Cassell Coliseum • Blacksburg, Virginia | ESPN | 9,847 | B1G (6–3) |
| Dec 1 | 9:15 pm | **Maryland** | Penn State | 62–39 | Bryce Jordan Center • University Park, Pennsylvania | ESPN2 | 9,078 | B1G (6–4) |
| Dec 1 | 9:30 pm | No. 1 **Duke** | No. 6 Michigan State | 84–79 | Cameron Indoor Stadium • Durham, North Carolina | ESPN | 9,314 | B1G (6–5) |
**Winners are in bold** Game times in EST. Rankings from AP Poll (Nov 29). Miami did not play due to the ACC having one more team than the B1G.

=== 2009 Big Ten 6–5 ===
| Date | Time | ACC team | Big Ten team | Score | Location | Television | Attendance | Challenge leader |
|---|---|---|---|---|---|---|---|---|
| Nov 30 | 7:00 pm | Virginia | **Penn State** | 69–66 | John Paul Jones Arena • Charlottesville, Virginia | ESPN2 | 8,898 | B1G (1–0) |
| Dec 1 | 7:00 pm | Wake Forest | No. 4 **Purdue** | 69–58 | Mackey Arena • West Lafayette, Indiana | ESPN | 14,123 | B1G (2–0) |
| Dec 1 | 7:00 pm | NC State | **Northwestern** | 65–53 | RBC Center • Raleigh, North Carolina | ESPNU | 11,913 | B1G (3–0) |
| Dec 1 | 7:30 pm | **Maryland** | Indiana | 80–68 | Assembly Hall • Bloomington, Indiana | ESPN2 | 17,039 | B1G (3–1) |
| Dec 1 | 9:00 pm | No. 10 **North Carolina** | No. 9 Michigan State | 89–82 | Dean Smith Center • Chapel Hill, North Carolina | ESPN | 21,346 | B1G (3–2) |
| Dec 1 | 9:30 pm | **Virginia Tech** | Iowa | 70–64 | Carver–Hawkeye Arena • Iowa City, Iowa | ESPN2 | 8,755 | Tied (3–3) |
| Dec 2 | 7:15 pm | No. 18 Clemson | **Illinois** | 76–74 | Littlejohn Coliseum • Clemson, South Carolina | ESPN | 10,000 | B1G (4–3) |
| Dec 2 | 7:15 pm | **Miami** | Minnesota | 63–58 | BankUnited Center • Coral Gables, Florida | ESPNU | 5,157 | Tied (4–4) |
| Dec 2 | 7:30 pm | **Boston College** | Michigan | 62–58 | Crisler Arena • Ann Arbor, Michigan | ESPN2 | 10,718 | ACC (5–4) |
| Dec 2 | 9:15 pm | No. 6 Duke | **Wisconsin** | 73–69 | Kohl Center • Madison, Wisconsin | ESPN | 17,230 | Tied (5–5) |
| Dec 2 | 9:30 pm | No. 21 Florida State | No. 15 **Ohio State** | 77–64 | Value City Arena • Columbus, Ohio | ESPN2 | 13,514 | B1G (6–5) |
**Winners are in bold** Game times in EST. Rankings from AP Poll (Nov 30). Georgia Tech did not play due to the ACC having one more team than the B1G. The North Carolina/Michigan State match-up was a rematch of the 2009 NCAA Championship game.

=== 2008 ACC 6–5 ===
| Date | Time | ACC team | Big Ten team | Score | Location | Television | Attendance | Challenge leader |
|---|---|---|---|---|---|---|---|---|
| Dec 1 | 7:00 pm | Virginia Tech | **Wisconsin** | 74–72 | Cassell Coliseum • Blacksburg, Virginia | ESPN2 | 9,847 | B1G (1–0) |
| Dec 2 | 7:00 pm | **Boston College** | Iowa | 57–55 | Conte Forum • Chestnut Hill, Massachusetts | ESPNU | 4,084 | Tied (1–1) |
| Dec 2 | 7:00 pm | No. 21 Miami | **Ohio State** | 73–68 | BankUnited Center • Coral Gables, Florida | ESPN | 5,870 | B1G (2–1) |
| Dec 2 | 7:30 pm | **Clemson** | Illinois | 76–74 | Assembly Hall • Champaign, Illinois | ESPN2 | 14,741 | Tied (2–2) |
| Dec 2 | 9:00 pm | No. 4 **Duke** | No. 9 Purdue | 76–60 | Mackey Arena • West Lafayette, Indiana | ESPN | 14,123 | ACC (3–2) |
| Dec 2 | 9:30 pm | Virginia | **Minnesota** | 66–56 | Williams Arena • Minneapolis, Minnesota | ESPN2 | 12,424 | Tied (3–3) |
| Dec 3 | 7:15 pm | No. 15 **Wake Forest** | Indiana | 83–58 | LJVM Coliseum • Winston-Salem, North Carolina | ESPN | 12,445 | ACC (4–3) |
| Dec 3 | 7:30 pm | **Maryland** | Michigan | 75–70 | Comcast Center • College Park, Maryland | ESPNU | 17,950 | ACC (5–3) |
| Dec 3 | 7:30 pm | Georgia Tech | **Penn State** | 85–83 | Alexander Memorial Coliseum • Atlanta, Georgia | ESPN2 | 7,900 | ACC (5–4) |
| Dec 3 | 9:15 pm | No. 1 **North Carolina** | No. 13 Michigan State | 98–63 | Ford Field • Detroit, Michigan | ESPN | 25,267 | ACC (6–4) |
| Dec 3 | 9:30 pm | Florida State | **Northwestern** | 73–59 | Welsh-Ryan Arena • Evanston, Illinois | ESPN2 | 3,537 | ACC (6–5) |
**Winners are in bold** Game times in EST. Rankings from AP Poll (Dec 1). NC State did not play due to the ACC having one more team than the B1G.

=== 2007 ACC 8–3 ===
| Date | Time | ACC team | Big Ten team | Score | Location | Television | Attendance | Challenge leader |
|---|---|---|---|---|---|---|---|---|
| Nov 26 | 7:00 pm | **Wake Forest** | Iowa | 56–47 | Carver–Hawkeye Arena • Iowa City, Iowa | ESPN2 | 9,120 | ACC (1–0) |
| Nov 27 | 7:00 pm | Georgia Tech | No. 15 **Indiana** | 83–79 | Assembly Hall • Bloomington, Indiana | ESPN | 17,230 | Tied (1–1) |
| Nov 27 | 7:30 pm | **Florida State** | Minnesota | 75–61 | Donald L. Tucker Center • Tallahassee, Florida | ESPN2 | 9,349 | ACC (2–1) |
| Nov 27 | 8:00 pm | **Virginia** | Northwestern | 94–52 | John Paul Jones Arena • Charlottesville, Virginia | ESPNU | 12,609 | ACC (3–1) |
| Nov 27 | 9:00 pm | No. 7 **Duke** | No. 20 Wisconsin | 82–58 | Cameron Indoor Stadium • Durham, North Carolina | ESPN | 9,314 | ACC (4–1) |
| Nov 27 | 9:30 pm | No. 18 **Clemson** | Purdue | 61–58 | Littlejohn Coliseum • Clemson, South Carolina | ESPN2 | 7,350 | ACC (5–1) |
| Nov 28 | 7:00 pm | No. 24 NC State | No. 10 **Michigan State** | 81–58 | Breslin Center • East Lansing, Michigan | ESPN | 14,759 | ACC (5–2) |
| Nov 28 | 7:30 pm | **Maryland** | Illinois | 69–61 | Comcast Center • College Park, Maryland | ESPN2 | 17,950 | ACC (6–2) |
| Nov 28 | 8:00 pm | **Boston College** | Michigan | 77–64 | Crisler Arena • Ann Arbor, Michigan | ESPNU | 8,716 | ACC (7–2) |
| Nov 28 | 9:00 pm | No. 1 **North Carolina** | Ohio State | 66–55 | Value City Arena • Columbus, Ohio | ESPN | 19,049 | ACC (8–2) |
| Nov 28 | 9:30 pm | Virginia Tech | **Penn State** | 66–61 | Bryce Jordan Center • University Park, Pennsylvania | ESPN2 | 9,368 | ACC (8–3) |
**Winners are in bold** Game times in EST. Rankings from AP Poll (Nov 26). Miami did not play due to the ACC having one more team than the B1G.

=== 2006 ACC 8–3 ===
| Date | Time | ACC team | Big Ten team | Score | Location | Television | Attendance | Challenge leader |
|---|---|---|---|---|---|---|---|---|
| Nov 27 | 7:00 pm | **NC State** | Michigan | 74–67 | RBC Center • Raleigh, North Carolina | ESPN2 | 13,135 | ACC (1–0) |
| Nov 28 | 7:00 pm | No. 23 **Maryland** | Illinois | 72–66 | Assembly Hall • Champaign, Illinois | ESPN | 16,618 | ACC (2–0) |
| Nov 28 | 7:30 pm | Florida State | No. 12 **Wisconsin** | 81–66 | Kohl Center • Madison, Wisconsin | ESPN2 | 17,190 | ACC (2–1) |
| Nov 28 | 8:00 pm | No. 21 **Georgia Tech** | Penn State | 77–73 | Alexander Memorial Coliseum • Atlanta, Georgia | ESPNU | 9,191 | ACC (3–1) |
| Nov 28 | 9:00 pm | No. 11 **Duke** | Indiana | 54–51 | Cameron Indoor Stadium • Durham, North Carolina | ESPN | 9,314 | ACC (4–1) |
| Nov 28 | 9:30 pm | Miami | **Northwestern** | 61–59 | Welsh-Ryan Arena • Evanston, Illinois | ESPN2 | 3,938 | ACC (4–2) |
| Nov 29 | 7:00 pm | **Boston College** | Michigan State | 65–58 | Conte Forum • Chestnut Hill, Massachusetts | ESPN | 8,606 | ACC (5–2) |
| Nov 29 | 7:30 pm | No. 25 Virginia | **Purdue** | 61–59 | Mackey Arena • West Lafayette, Indiana | ESPN2 | 11,534 | ACC (5–3) |
| Nov 29 | 8:00 pm | **Virginia Tech** | Iowa | 69–65 | Cassell Coliseum • Blacksburg, Virginia | ESPNU | 9,847 | ACC 6–3) |
| Nov 29 | 9:00 pm | No. 7 **North Carolina** | No. 3 Ohio State | 98–89 | Dean Smith Center • Chapel Hill, North Carolina | ESPN | 21,750 | ACC (7–3) |
| Nov 29 | 9:30 pm | **Clemson** | Minnesota | 90–68 | Williams Arena • Minneapolis, Minnesota | ESPN2 | 10,142 | ACC (8–3) |
**Winners are in bold** Game times in EST. Rankings from AP Poll (Nov 27). Boston College made its inaugural appearance in the event. Wake Forest did not play due to the ACC having one more team than the B1G.

=== 2005 ACC 6–5 ===
| Date | Time | ACC team | Big Ten team | Score | Location | Television | Attendance | Challenge leader |
|---|---|---|---|---|---|---|---|---|
| Nov 28 | 7:30 pm | Virginia Tech | **Ohio State** | 69–56 | Value City Arena • Columbus, Ohio | ESPN2 | 13,218 | B1G 1–0 |
| Nov 29 | 7:00 pm | No. 22 **Wake Forest** | Wisconsin | 91–88 | LJVM Coliseum • Winston-Salem, North Carolina | ESPN | 14,655 | Tied 1–1 |
| Nov 29 | 7:30 pm | **Florida State** | Purdue | 97–57 | Donald L. Tucker Center • Tallahassee, Florida | ESPN2 | 7,022 | ACC 2–1 |
| Nov 29 | 8:00 pm | **Clemson** | Penn State | 96–88 | Bryce Jordan Center • University Park, Pennsylvania | ESPNU | 6,108 | ACC 3–1 |
| Nov 29 | 9:00 pm | North Carolina | No. 12 **Illinois** | 68–64 | Dean Smith Center • Chapel Hill, North Carolina | ESPN | 21,273 | ACC 3–2 |
| Nov 29 | 9:30 pm | Miami | **Michigan** | 74–53 | Crisler Arena • Ann Arbor, Michigan | ESPN2 | 8,257 | Tied 3–3 |
| Nov 30 | 7:00 pm | Georgia Tech | No. 13 **Michigan State** | 88–86 | Breslin Center • East Lansing, Michigan | ESPN | 14,759 | B1G 4–3 |
| Nov 30 | 7:30 pm | No. 23 **Maryland** | Minnesota | 83–66 | Comcast Center • College Park, Maryland | ESPN2 | 17,950 | Tied 4–4 |
| Nov 30 | 8:00 pm | **Virginia** | Northwestern | 72–57 | University Hall • Charlottesville, Virginia | ESPNU | 7,331 | ACC 5–4 |
| Nov 30 | 9:00 pm | No. 1 **Duke** | No. 17 Indiana | 75–67 | Assembly Hall • Bloomington, Indiana | ESPN | 17,343 | ACC 6–4 |
| Nov 30 | 9:30 pm | No. 24 NC State | No. 14 **Iowa** | 45–42 | Carver–Hawkeye Arena • Iowa City, Iowa | ESPN2 | 13,043 | ACC 6–5 |
**Winners are in bold** Game times in EST. Rankings from AP Poll (Nov 28). Miami and Virginia Tech made their inaugural appearances in the event. No. 8 Boston College did not play due to the ACC having one more team than the B1G. The North Carolina/Illinois match-up was a rematch of the 2005 NCAA Championship game.

=== 2004 ACC 7–2 ===
| Date | Time | ACC team | Big Ten team | Score | Location | Television | Attendance | Challenge leader |
|---|---|---|---|---|---|---|---|---|
| Nov 29 | 7:00 pm | No. 16 **NC State** | Purdue | 60–53 | RBC Center • Raleigh, North Carolina | ESPN2 | 13,918 | ACC 1–0 |
| Nov 30 | 7:00 pm | No. 4 **Georgia Tech** | Michigan | 99–68 | Alexander Memorial Coliseum • Atlanta, Georgia | ESPN | 9,191 | ACC 2–0 |
| Nov 30 | 7:30 pm | **Florida State** | Minnesota | 70–69 | Williams Arena • Minneapolis, Minnesota | ESPN2 | 9,081 | ACC 3–0 |
| Nov 30 | 9:00 pm | No. 10 **Duke** | No. 11 Michigan State | 81–74 | Cameron Indoor Stadium • Durham, North Carolina | ESPN | 9,314 | ACC 4–0 |
| Nov 30 | 9:30 pm | No. 12 Maryland | No. 25 **Wisconsin** | 69–64 | Kohl Center • Madison, Wisconsin | ESPN2 | 17,142 | ACC 4–1 |
| Dec 1 | 7:00 pm | No. 1 Wake Forest | No. 5 **Illinois** | 91–73 | Assembly Hall • Champaign, Illinois | ESPN | 16,618 | ACC 4–2 |
| Dec 1 | 7:30 pm | **Clemson** | Ohio State | 80–73 | Littlejohn Coliseum • Clemson, South Carolina | ESPN2 | 7,800 | ACC 5–2 |
| Dec 1 | 9:00 pm | No. 9 **North Carolina** | Indiana | 70–63 | Assembly Hall • Bloomington, Indiana | ESPN | 17,404 | ACC 6–2 |
| Dec 1 | 9:30 pm | No. 24 **Virginia** | Northwestern | 48–44 | Welsh-Ryan Arena • Evanston, Illinois | ESPN2 | 4,283 | ACC 7–2 |
**Winners are in bold** Game times in EST. Rankings from AP Poll (Nov 29). No. 23 Iowa, Penn State, Miami, and Virginia Tech did not play.

=== 2003 ACC 7–2 ===
| Date | Time | ACC team | Big Ten team | Score | Location | Television | Attendance | Challenge leader |
|---|---|---|---|---|---|---|---|---|
| Dec 1 | 7:00 pm | **Florida State** | Northwestern | 71–53 | Donald L. Tucker Center • Tallahassee, Florida | ESPN2 | 5,487 | ACC 1–0 |
| Dec 2 | 7:00 pm | No. 18 **Wake Forest** | Indiana | 100–67 | LJVM Coliseum • Winston-Salem, North Carolina | ESPN | 13,249 | ACC 2–0 |
| Dec 2 | 7:30 pm | NC State | **Michigan** | 68–61 | Crisler Arena • Ann Arbor, Michigan | ESPN2 | 11,789 | ACC 2–1 |
| Dec 2 | 9:00 pm | No. 10 **North Carolina** | No. 11 Illinois | 88–81 | Greensboro Coliseum • Greensboro, North Carolina | ESPN | 16,211 | ACC 3–1 |
| Dec 2 | 9:30 pm | **Maryland** | No. 15 Wisconsin | 73–67 | Comcast Center • College Park, Maryland | ESPN2 | 17,950 | ACC 4–1 |
| Dec 3 | 7:00 pm | No. 13 **Georgia Tech** | Ohio State | 73–53 | Value City Arena • Columbus, Ohio | ESPN | 13,859 | ACC 5–1 |
| Dec 3 | 7:30 pm | Clemson | No. 20 **Purdue** | 76–64 | Mackey Arena • West Lafayette, Indiana | ESPN2 | 11,217 | ACC 5–2 |
| Dec 3 | 9:00 pm | No. 6 **Duke** | No. 5 Michigan State | 72–50 | Breslin Center • East Lansing, Michigan | ESPN | 14,759 | ACC 6–2 |
| Dec 3 | 9:30 pm | **Virginia** | Minnesota | 86–78 | University Hall • Charlottesville, Virginia | ESPN2 | 7,084 | ACC 7–2 |
**Winners are in bold** Game times in EST. Rankings from AP Poll (Dec 1). Iowa and Penn State did not play due to the B1G having two more teams than the ACC.

=== 2002 ACC 5–4 ===
| Date | Time | ACC team | Big Ten team | Score | Location | Television | Attendance | Challenge leader |
|---|---|---|---|---|---|---|---|---|
| Dec 2 | 9:00 pm | **Florida State** | Iowa | 80–67 | Donald L. Tucker Center • Tallahassee, Florida | ESPN2 | 6,060 | ACC 1–0 |
| Dec 3 | 7:30 pm | No. 4 **Duke** | Ohio State | 91–76 | Greensboro Coliseum • Greensboro, North Carolina | ESPN | 16,064 | ACC 2–0 |
| Dec 3 | 7:30 pm | **Clemson** | Penn State | 79–70 | Anderson Civic Center • Anderson, South Carolina | ESPN2 | 5,000 | ACC 3–0 |
| Dec 3 | 9:00 pm | No. 9 Maryland | No. 10 **Indiana** | 80–74^{OT} | Conseco Fieldhouse • Indianapolis, Indiana | ESPN | 15,715 | ACC 3–1 |
| Dec 3 | 9:30 pm | No. 14 North Carolina | No. 25 **Illinois** | 92–65 | Assembly Hall • Champaign, Illinois | ESPN2 | 16,500 | ACC 3–2 |
| Dec 4 | 7:00 pm | Georgia Tech | No. 20 **Minnesota** | 64–63 | Williams Arena • Minneapolis, Minnesota | ESPN | 12,783 | TIE 3–3 |
| Dec 4 | 7:30 pm | **NC State** | Northwestern | 74–49 | RBC Center • Raleigh, North Carolina | ESPN2 | 3,833 | ACC 4–3 |
| Dec 4 | 9:00 pm | No. 22 Virginia | No. 21 **Michigan State** | 82–75 | Breslin Center • East Lansing, Michigan | ESPN | 14,759 | TIE 4–4 |
| Dec 4 | 9:30 pm | **Wake Forest** | No. 23 Wisconsin | 90–80 | Kohl Center • Madison, Wisconsin | ESPN2 | 16,624 | ACC 5–4 |
**Winners are in bold** Game times in EST. Rankings from AP Poll (Dec 2). Michigan and Purdue did not play due to the B1G having two more teams than the ACC. The Indiana/Maryland game was a rematch of the 2002 NCAA national title game in Atlanta, Georgia.

=== 2001 ACC 5–3 ===
| Date | Time | ACC team | Big Ten team | Score | Location | Television | Attendance | Challenge leader |
|---|---|---|---|---|---|---|---|---|
| Nov 27 | 7:00 pm | No. 5 **Maryland** | No. 2 Illinois | 76–63 | Cole Field House • College Park, Maryland | ESPN | 14,500 | ACC 1–0 |
| Nov 27 | 7:30 pm | NC State | **Ohio State** | 64–50 | Value City Arena • Columbus, Ohio | ESPN2 | 15,091 | TIE 1–1 |
| Nov 27 | 9:00 pm | No. 1 **Duke** | No. 7 Iowa | 80–62 | United Center • Chicago, Illinois | ESPN | 17,296 | ACC 2–1 |
| Nov 27 | 9:30 pm | No. 25 **Wake Forest** | Minnesota | 85–79 | LJVM Coliseum • Winston-Salem, North Carolina | ESPN2 | 9,227 | ACC 3–1 |
| Nov 28 | 7:00 pm | **Georgia Tech** | Wisconsin | 62–61 | Alexander Memorial Coliseum • Atlanta, Georgia | ESPN | 4,242 | ACC 4–1 |
| Nov 28 | 7:30 pm | No. 11 Virginia | No. 22 Michigan State | Cancelled | Richmond Coliseum • Richmond, Virginia | ESPN2 | 11,666 | ACC 4–1 |
| Nov 28 | 8:00 pm | **Clemson** | Penn State | 79–66 | Bryce Jordan Center • University Park, Pennsylvania | | 7,839 | ACC 5–1 |
| Nov 28 | 9:00 pm | North Carolina | **Indiana** | 79–66 | Dean Smith Center • Chapel Hill, North Carolina | ESPN | 18,358 | ACC 5–2 |
| Nov 28 | 9:30 pm | Florida State | **Northwestern** | 57–50 | Welsh-Ryan Arena • Evanston, Illinois | ESPN2 | 3,371 | ACC 5–3 |
**Winners are in bold** Game times in EST. Rankings from AP Poll (Nov 26). Michigan and Purdue did not play due to the B1G having two more teams than the ACC. The Michigan State/Virginia game was cancelled during the game's second half due to unsafe court conditions. Virginia led 31–28 at the time the game was called.

=== 2000 ACC 5–4 ===
| Date | Time | ACC team | Big Ten team | Score | Location | Television | Attendance | Challenge leader |
|---|---|---|---|---|---|---|---|---|
| Nov 28 | 7:00 pm | No. 12 **Wake Forest** | Michigan | 71–60 | Crisler Arena • Ann Arbor, Michigan | ESPN | 9,767 | ACC 1–0 |
| Nov 28 | 7:30 pm | **Clemson** | Northwestern | 57–44 | Littlejohn Coliseum • Clemson, South Carolina | ESPN2 | 7,500 | ACC 2–0 |
| Nov 28 | 9:00 pm | No. 1 **Duke** | No. 9 Illinois | 78–77 | Greensboro Coliseum • Greensboro, North Carolina | ESPN | 17,966 | ACC 3–0 |
| Nov 28 | 9:30 pm | Georgia Tech | **Iowa** | 85–67 | Carver–Hawkeye Arena • Iowa City, Iowa | ESPN2 | 15,500 | ACC 3–1 |
| Nov 29 | 7:00 pm | No. 21 **Virginia** | Purdue | 98–79 | University Hall • Charlottesville, Virginia | ESPN | 8,296 | ACC 4–1 |
| Nov 29 | 7:30 pm | No. 6 North Carolina | No. 3 **Michigan State** | 77–64 | Breslin Center • East Lansing, Michigan | ESPN2 | 14,759 | ACC 4–2 |
| Nov 29 | 8:00 pm | Florida State | **Minnesota** | 79–71 | Donald L. Tucker Center • Tallahassee, Florida | ESPN Regional | | ACC 4–3 |
| Nov 29 | 9:00 pm | No. 13 Maryland | No. 23 **Wisconsin** | 78–75^{OT} | Bradley Center • Milwaukee, Wisconsin | ESPN | 7,521 | TIE 4–4 |
| Nov 29 | 9:30 pm | **NC State** | Penn State | 84–76 | RBC Center • Raleigh, North Carolina | ESPN2 | | ACC 5–4 |
**Winners are in bold** Game times in EST. Rankings from AP Poll (Nov 27). Indiana and Ohio State did not play due to the B1G having two more teams than the ACC.

=== 1999 ACC 5–4 ===
| Date | Time | ACC team | Big Ten team | Score | Location | Television | Attendance | Challenge leader |
|---|---|---|---|---|---|---|---|---|
| Nov 30 | 7:00 pm | **Wake Forest** | Wisconsin | 67–48 | LJVM Coliseum • Winston-Salem, North Carolina | ESPN | 11,245 | ACC 1–0 |
| Nov 30 | 7:30 pm | No. 24 **Maryland** | Iowa | 83–65 | Baltimore Arena • Baltimore, Maryland | ESPN2 | 12,310 | ACC 2–0 |
| Nov 30 | 9:00 pm | No. 17 **Duke** | No. 16 Illinois | 72–69 | United Center • Chicago, Illinois | ESPN | 20,143 | ACC 3–0 |
| Nov 30 | 9:30 pm | Virginia | **Minnesota** | 74–62 | Williams Arena • Minneapolis, Minnesota | ESPN2 | 13,485 | ACC 3–1 |
| Dec 1 | 7:00 pm | Georgia Tech | **Michigan** | 80–77 | Philips Arena • Atlanta, Georgia | ESPN | 11,423 | ACC 3–2 |
| Dec 1 | 7:30 pm | **NC State** | No. 19 Purdue | 61–59 | Mackey Arena • West Lafayette, Indiana | ESPN2 | 13,939 | ACC 4–2 |
| Dec 1 | 8:00 pm | Clemson | **Penn State** | 85–75 | Bryce Jordan Center • University Park, Pennsylvania | ESPN+ | 8,868 | ACC 4–3 |
| Dec 1 | 9:00 pm | No. 2 North Carolina | No. 8 **Michigan State** | 86–76 | Dean Smith Center • Chapel Hill, North Carolina | ESPN | 21,572 | TIE 4–4 |
| Dec 1 | 9:00 pm | **Florida State** | Northwestern | 60–46 | Welsh-Ryan Arena • Evanston, Illinois | ESPN2 | | ACC 5–4 |
**Winners are in bold** Game times in EST. Rankings from AP Poll (Nov 29). No. 23 Indiana and No. 15 Ohio State did not play due to the B1G having two more teams than the ACC.
