= 2002–03 Wake Forest Demon Deacons men's basketball team =

American college basketball season

2002–03 Wake Forest Demon Deacons men's basketball

ACC Regular season champions

NCAA tournament, second round
- Conference: Atlantic Coast Conference

Ranking
- Coaches: No. 12
- AP: No. 8
- Record: 25–6 (13–3 ACC)
- Head coach: Skip Prosser (2nd season)
- Assistant coach: Dino Gaudio (2nd season)
- Home arena: LJVM Coliseum

2002–03 ACC men's basketball standings
	Conf.				Overall
Team	W		L	PCT	W		L	PCT
No. 8 Wake Forest	13	–	3	.813	25	–	6	.806
No. 17 Maryland	11	–	5	.688	21	–	10	.677
No. 7 Duke†	11	–	5	.688	26	–	7	.788
NC State	9	–	7	.563	18	–	13	.581
Georgia Tech	7	–	9	.438	16	–	15	.516
Virginia	6	–	10	.375	16	–	16	.500
North Carolina	6	–	10	.375	19	–	16	.543
Clemson	5	–	11	.313	15	–	13	.536
Florida State	4	–	12	.250	14	–	15	.483
† 2003 ACC tournament winner Rankings from AP Poll

The 2002–03 Wake Forest Demon Deacons men's basketball team represented Wake Forest University as a member of the Atlantic Coast Conference during the 2002–03 NCAA Division I men's basketball season. Led by head coach Skip Prosser, the team played their home games at Lawrence Joel Veterans Memorial Coliseum in Winston-Salem, North Carolina. The Demon Deacons won the ACC regular season title by two games over Maryland, but would lose in the semifinals of the ACC Tournament. Wake Forest received an at-large bid to the NCAA tournament as the No. 2 seed in the East region. After a 3-point win over East Tennessee State in the opening round, the Deacons were upset by No. 10 seed Auburn in the second round to end the season with a record of 25–6 (13–3 ACC).

== Roster ==
2002–03 Wake Forest Demon Deacons men's basketball team
Players
Coaches

Pos.	#	Name	Height	Weight	Year	Previous school	Hometown
G	1	Justin Gray	6 ft 3 in (1.91 m)	185 lb (84 kg)	Fr	Oak Hill Academy	Raleigh, North Carolina
F	5	Josh Howard (C)	6 ft 7 in (2.01 m)	205 lb (93 kg)	Sr	Hargrave Military Academy	Winston-Salem, North Carolina
C	31	Eric Williams	6 ft 9 in (2.06 m)	270 lb (122 kg)	Fr	Wake Forest-Rolesville HS	Wake Forest, North Carolina

Head coach

- Skip Prosser

Assistant coach(es)

Legend

- (C) Team captain
- (S) Suspended
- (I) Ineligible
- (W) Walk-on
- Injured
- Current redshirt

Roster

== Schedule and results ==
Date time, TV	Rank^{#}	Opponent^{#}	Result	Record	Site city, state
Regular season
Nov 27, 2002*		Yale	W 73–61	1–0	Lawrence Joel Coliseum; Winston-Salem, North Carolina
Dec 1, 2002*		Temple	W 83–76	2–0	Lawrence Joel Coliseum; Winston-Salem, North Carolina
Dec 4, 2002*		at No. 23 Wisconsin; ACC–Big Ten Challenge	W 90–80	3–0	Kohl Center; Madison, Wisconsin
Dec 15, 2002*		SMU	W 73–49	4–0	Lawrence Joel Coliseum; Winston-Salem, North Carolina
Dec 18, 2002*		South Carolina State	W 100–57	5–0	Lawrence Joel Coliseum; Winston-Salem, North Carolina
Dec 21, 2002*		St. John's	W 84–72	6–0	Lawrence Joel Coliseum; Winston-Salem, North Carolina
Dec 28, 2002*	No. 25	North Carolina A&T	W 104–64	7–0	Lawrence Joel Coliseum; Winston-Salem, North Carolina
Dec 30, 2002*	No. 23	Bethune-Cookman	W 96–54	8–0	Lawrence Joel Coliseum; Winston-Salem, North Carolina
Jan 4, 2003*	No. 23	at Richmond	W 68–62	9–0	Robins Center; Richmond, Virginia
Jan 7, 2003*	No. 17	Elon	W 98–56	10–0	Lawrence Joel Coliseum; Winston-Salem, North Carolina
Jan 12, 2003	No. 17	at No. 1 Duke	L 55–74	10–1 (0–1)	Cameron Indoor Stadium; Durham, North Carolina
Jan 15, 2003	No. 19	No. 17 Maryland	W 81–72	11–1 (1–1)	Lawrence Joel Coliseum; Winston-Salem, North Carolina
Jan 19, 2003	No. 19	Georgia Tech	W 73–66	12–1 (2–1)	Lawrence Joel Coliseum; Winston-Salem, North Carolina
Jan 23, 2003	No. 17	at Virginia	L 75–85	12–2 (2–2)	University Hall; Charlottesville, Virginia
Jan 26, 2003	No. 17	Florida State	W 71–60	13–2 (3–2)	Lawrence Joel Coliseum; Winston-Salem, North Carolina
Jan 28, 2003	No. 17	at Clemson	W 81–60	14–2 (4–2)	Littlejohn Coliseum; Clemson, South Carolina
Feb 2, 2003	No. 17	at North Carolina	W 79–75	15–2 (5–2)	Dean Smith Center; Chapel Hill, North Carolina
Feb 6, 2003	No. 14	NC State	W 73–58	16–2 (6–2)	Lawrence Joel Coliseum; Winston-Salem, North Carolina
Feb 9, 2003*	No. 14	at No. 15 Marquette	L 61–68	16–3	Bradley Center; Milwaukee, Wisconsin
Feb 13, 2003	No. 14	No. 8 Duke	W 94–80 ^{2OT}	17–3 (7–2)	Lawrence Joel Coliseum; Winston-Salem, North Carolina
Feb 17, 2003	No. 10	at No. 13 Maryland	L 67–90	17–4 (7–3)	Comcast Center; College Park, Maryland
Feb 20, 2003	No. 10	at Georgia Tech	W 75–67	18–4 (8–3)	Alexander Memorial Coliseum; Atlanta, Georgia
Feb 23, 2003	No. 10	Virginia	W 75–71	19–4 (9–3)	Lawrence Joel Coliseum; Winston-Salem, North Carolina
Feb 26, 2003	No. 12	at Florida State	W 60–56	20–4 (10–3)	Donald L. Tucker Center; Tallahassee, Florida
Mar 1, 2003	No. 12	Clemson	W 80–68	21–4 (11–3)	Lawrence Joel Coliseum; Winston-Salem, North Carolina
Mar 5, 2003	No. 9	North Carolina	W 75–60	22–4 (12–3)	Lawrence Joel Coliseum; Winston-Salem, North Carolina
Mar 8, 2003	No. 9	at NC State	W 78–72	23–4 (13–3)	RBC Center; Raleigh, North Carolina
ACC Tournament
Mar 14, 2003*	No. 9	Florida State; Quarterfinals	W 69–61	24–4	Greensboro Coliseum; Greensboro, North Carolina
Mar 15, 2003*	No. 9	vs. NC State; Semifinals	L 83–87	24–5	Greensboro Coliseum; Greensboro, North Carolina
NCAA Tournament
Mar 21, 2003*	(2 E) No. 8	vs. (15 E) East Tennessee State; First Round	W 76–73	25–5	St. Pete Times Forum; St. Petersburg, Florida
Mar 23, 2003*	(2 E) No. 8	vs. (10 E) Auburn; Second Round	L 62–68	25–6	St. Pete Times Forum; St. Petersburg, Florida
*Non-conference game. ^{#}Rankings from AP Poll. (#) Tournament seedings in parentheses. E=East. All times are in Eastern Standard Time.
