= 2003 ACC men's basketball tournament =

- 2003 ACC Tournament logo
- Classification: Division I
- Season: 2002–03
- Teams: 9
- Site: Greensboro Coliseum; Greensboro, North Carolina
- Champions: Duke (14th title)
- Winning coach: Mike Krzyzewski (8th title)
- MVP: Daniel Ewing (Duke)

The 2003 Atlantic Coast Conference men's basketball tournament took place from March 13 to 16 in Greensboro, North Carolina, at the Greensboro Coliseum. The 2003 edition marked the 50th ACC Tournament. Duke won the tournament for the fifth straight time, defeating NC State in the championship game for the second year in a row. Duke's Daniel Ewing won the tournament's Most Valuable Player award.

2002–03 ACC men's basketball standings
| | Conf. | | | | Overall |
| Team | W | | L | PCT | W | | L | PCT |
|---|---|---|---|---|---|---|---|---|
| No. 8 Wake Forest | 13 | – | 3 | .813 | 25 | – | 6 | .806 |
| No. 17 Maryland | 11 | – | 5 | .688 | 21 | – | 10 | .677 |
| No. 7 Duke† | 11 | – | 5 | .688 | 26 | – | 7 | .788 |
| NC State | 9 | – | 7 | .563 | 18 | – | 13 | .581 |
| Georgia Tech | 7 | – | 9 | .438 | 16 | – | 15 | .516 |
| Virginia | 6 | – | 10 | .375 | 16 | – | 16 | .500 |
| North Carolina | 6 | – | 10 | .375 | 19 | – | 16 | .543 |
| Clemson | 5 | – | 11 | .313 | 15 | – | 13 | .536 |
| Florida State | 4 | – | 12 | .250 | 14 | – | 15 | .483 |
† 2003 ACC tournament winner Rankings from AP Poll

== Bracket ==
First round March 13, 2003
8 | Clemson | 61
9 | Florida State | 72

Quarterfinals; March 14, 2003
1 | #9 Wake Forest | 69
9 | Florida State | 61
4 | NC State | 71
5 | Georgia Tech | 55
2 | #14 Maryland | 72
7 | North Carolina | 84
3 | #12 Duke | 83
6 | Virginia | 76

Semifinals; March 15, 2003
1 | #9 Wake Forest | 83
4 | NC State | 87
7 | North Carolina | 63
3 | #12 Duke | 75

Championship Game; March 16, 2003
4 | NC State | 77
3 | #12 Duke | 84

AP Rankings at time of tournament
