= 2003 National Invitation Tournament =

Annual NCAA basketball competition

- Season: 2002–03
- Teams: 40
- Finals site: Madison Square Garden, New York City
- Champions: St. John's Red Storm (vacated) (6th title)
- Runner-up: Georgetown Hoyas (2nd title game)
- Semifinalists: Texas Tech Red Raiders (1st semifinal); Minnesota Golden Gophers (4th semifinal)
- Winning coach: Mike Jarvis (1st title)
- MVP: Marcus Hatten (Vacated) (St. John's)

The 2003 National Invitation Tournament was the 2003 edition of the annual NCAA college basketball competition. This was the last NIT to include a third-place game until 2021.

During the following season, St. John's center Abe Keita revealed that a member of the team's staff had paid him nearly $300 a month for the past four seasons. As a result, St. John's took various actions, including vacating 43 wins in which Keita participated, among which were the team's victories and eventual championship in the 2003 NIT. St. John's became the third team in the history of the NIT to be forced to vacate its standing in the tournament. Marcus Hatten's tournament Most Valuable Player award also was vacated.

== Selected teams ==
Below is a list of the 40 teams selected for the tournament.

School	Conference	Record	Appearance	Last bid
Boston College	Big East	18–11	16th	1993
Boston University	America East	20–10	3rd	1986
Brown	Ivy	17–11	1st	Never
College of Charleston	Southern	24–7	3rd	1996
DePaul	C-USA	16–12	14th	1999
Drexel	Colonial	19–11	2nd	1997
Eastern Washington	Big Sky	18–12	1st	Never
Fairfield	MAAC	19–11	5th	1996
Georgetown	Big East	15–14	9th	2000
Georgia Tech	ACC	14–14	7th	1999
Hawaii	WAC	18–11	7th	1998
Iowa	Big Ten	15–13	4th	2002
Iowa State	Big 12	16–13	2nd	1984
Kent State	MAC	22–8	5th	2000
Louisiana-Lafayette	Sun Belt	20–9	5th	2002
Minnesota	Big Ten	16–12	10th	2002
Nevada	WAC	18–13	3rd	1997
North Carolina	ACC	17–15	5th	1974
Ohio State	Big Ten	17–14	7th	1993
Providence	Big East	16–13	16th	1999
Rhode Island	Atlantic 10	19–10	10th	1996
Richmond	Atlantic 10	16–12	7th	2002
~~St. John's~~	Big East	16–13	27th	1995
Saint Louis	C-USA	16–13	17th	1996
San Diego State	Mountain West	16–13	2nd	1982
Seton Hall	Big East	17–12	15th	2001
Siena	MAAC	19–10	5th	2000
Temple	Atlantic 10	16–15	13th	2002
Tennessee	SEC	17–11	10th	1996
Texas Tech	Big 12	18–12	3rd	1995
UAB	C-USA	17–11	8th	1998
UC Santa Barbara	Big West	18–13	4th	1993
UIC	Horizon	21–8	1st	Never
UNLV	Mountain West	21–10	7th	2002
Valparaiso	Mid-Continent	20–10	1st	Never
Villanova	Big East	15–15	15th	2002
Virginia	ACC	15–15	10th	2002
Western Michigan	MAC	19–10	2nd	1992
Wichita State	Missouri Valley	18–11	8th	1989
Wyoming	Mountain West	20–10	8th	2001

== Bracket ==
Below are the four first round brackets, along with the four-team championship bracket.

Opening Round
Iowa	62
Valparaiso	60
Iowa State	76
Wichita State	65

First Round
Texas Tech	66
Nevada	54
San Diego State	67
UC Santa Barbara	62^{OT}
Georgia Tech	72
Ohio State	58
Iowa	54
Iowa State	53

Second Round
Texas Tech	57
San Diego State	48
Georgia Tech	79
Iowa	78

Quarterfinals
Texas Tech	80
Georgia Tech	72

Opening Round
Siena	74
Villanova	59
Western Michigan	63
UIC	62

First Round
Siena	68
Western Michigan	62
UAB	82
Louisiana-Lafayette	80
~~St. John's~~	73
Boston University	57
Virginia	89
Brown	73

Second Round
Siena	71
UAB	80
~~St. John's~~	73
Virginia	63

Quarterfinals
UAB	71
~~St. John's~~	79

Opening Round
Providence	67
Richmond	49
College of Charleston	72
Kent State	66

First Round
North Carolina	83
DePaul	72
Wyoming	78
Eastern Washington	71
Georgetown	70
Tennessee	60
Providence	69
College of Charleston	64

Second Round
North Carolina	90
Wyoming	74
Georgetown	67
Providence	58

Quarterfinals
North Carolina	74
Georgetown	79

Opening Round
Temple	68
Drexel	59
Boston College	90
Fairfield	78

First Round
Temple	75
Boston College	62
Rhode Island	61
Seton Hall	60
Minnesota	62
Saint Louis	52
Hawaii	85
UNLV	68

Second Round
Temple	61
Rhode Island	53
Minnesota	84
Hawaii	70

Quarterfinals
Temple	58
Minnesota	63^{OT}

=== Semifinals & finals ===
Semifinals
Georgetown	88
Minnesota	74
Texas Tech	63
~~St. John's~~	64

Finals
Georgetown	67
~~St. John's~~	70

Third place game
Minnesota	61
Texas Tech	71

NOTE: St. John's later vacated its tournament wins and title championship due to an ineligible player.

== See also ==
- 2003 Women's National Invitation Tournament
- 2003 NCAA Division I men's basketball tournament
- 2003 NCAA Division II men's basketball tournament
- 2003 NCAA Division III men's basketball tournament
- 2003 NCAA Division I women's basketball tournament
- 2003 NAIA Division I men's basketball tournament
- 2003 NAIA Division II men's basketball tournament
