= 2002–03 Maryland Terrapins men's basketball team =

American college basketball season

2002–03 Maryland Terrapins men's basketball
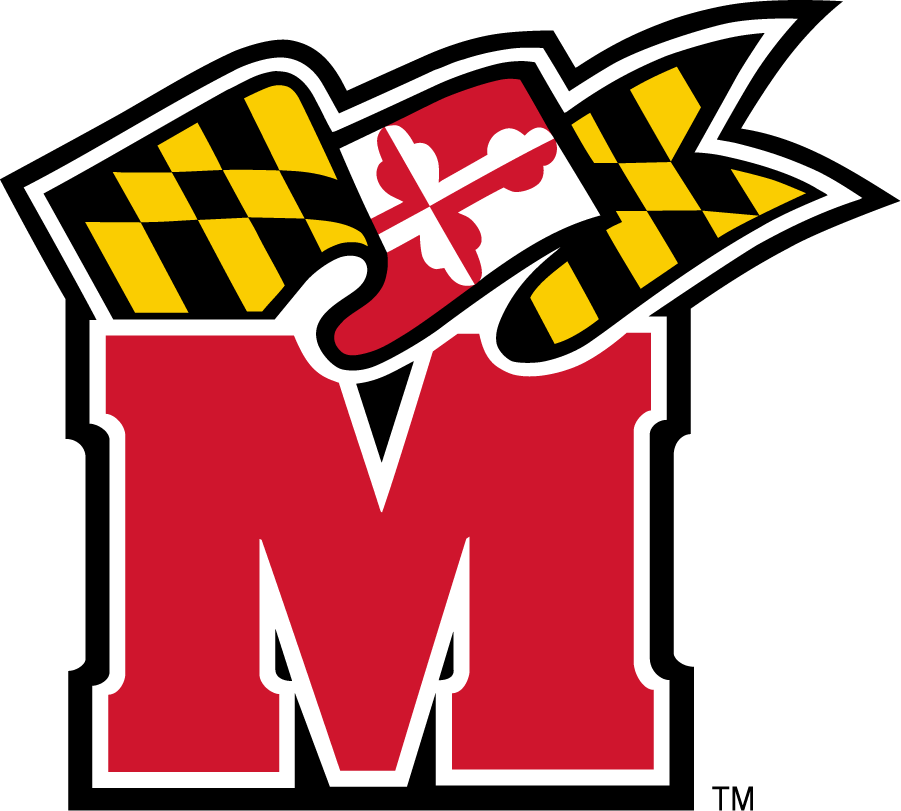

NCAA tournament, Sweet Sixteen
- Conference: Atlantic Coast Conference

Ranking
- Coaches: No. 10
- AP: No. 17
- Record: 21–10 (11–5 ACC)
- Head coach: Gary Williams
- Assistant coach: Dave Dickerson; Jimmy Patsos; Matt Kovarik; Troy Wainwright
- Home arena: Comcast Center

2002–03 ACC men's basketball standings
	Conf.				Overall
Team	W		L	PCT	W		L	PCT
No. 8 Wake Forest	13	–	3	.813	25	–	6	.806
No. 17 Maryland	11	–	5	.688	21	–	10	.677
No. 7 Duke†	11	–	5	.688	26	–	7	.788
NC State	9	–	7	.563	18	–	13	.581
Georgia Tech	7	–	9	.438	16	–	15	.516
Virginia	6	–	10	.375	16	–	16	.500
North Carolina	6	–	10	.375	19	–	16	.543
Clemson	5	–	11	.313	15	–	13	.536
Florida State	4	–	12	.250	14	–	15	.483
† 2003 ACC tournament winner Rankings from AP Poll

The 2002–03 Maryland Terrapins men's basketball team represented the University of Maryland in the 2002–2003 college basketball season as a member of the Atlantic Coast Conference (ACC). They advanced to the Sweet Sixteen in the 2003 NCAA basketball tournament.

2002–03 was the inaugural season of basketball at the Comcast Center. The team was coached by Gary Williams.

== Roster ==
2002–03 Maryland Terrapins men's basketball team
Players
Coaches

Pos.	#	Name	Height	Weight	Year	Hometown
F/C	1	Jamar Smith	6 ft 9 in (2.06 m)	239 lb (108 kg)	Jr	Sicklerville, New Jersey
G	2	Andre Collins	5 ft 9 in (1.75 m)	160 lb (73 kg)	So	Crisfield, Maryland
F/C	4	Travis Garrison	6 ft 8 in (2.03 m)	234 lb (106 kg)	So	Suitland, Maryland
G	5	Calvin McCall	6 ft 3 in (1.91 m)	210 lb (95 kg)	Sr	Orlando, Florida
G	11	John Gilchrist	6 ft 3 in (1.91 m)	190 lb (86 kg)	Fr	Virginia Beach, Virginia
G	12	Drew Nicholas	6 ft 3 in (1.91 m)	165 lb (75 kg)	Sr	Hempstead, New York
G	13	Chris McCray	6 ft 4 in (1.93 m)	166 lb (75 kg)	Fr	Capitol Heights, Maryland
F	20	Darien Henry	6 ft 6 in (1.98 m)	202 lb (92 kg)	So	Roxbury, New Jersey
F	21	Mike Grinnon	6 ft 6 in (1.98 m)	198 lb (90 kg)	So	Huntington, New York
F	22	Nik Caner-Medley	6 ft 8 in (2.03 m)	220 lb (100 kg)	Fr	Portland, Maine
G	25	Steve Blake	6 ft 3 in (1.91 m)	172 lb (78 kg)	Sr	Miami Lakes, Florida
F/C	33	Ryan Randle	6 ft 9 in (2.06 m)	245 lb (111 kg)	Sr	Duncanville, Texas
F/C	45	Tahj Holden	6 ft 10 in (2.08 m)	270 lb (122 kg)	Sr	Red Bank, New Jersey

Head coach

- Gary Williams

Assistant coach(es)

- Dave Dickerson
- Jimmy Patsos
- Matt Kovarik
- Troy Wainwright

Legend

- (C) Team captain
- (S) Suspended
- (I) Ineligible
- (W) Walk-on
- Injured
- Current redshirt

== Schedule ==
Date time, TV	Rank^{#}	Opponent^{#}	Result	Record	Site city, state
Regular Season
November 24	No. 12	Miami (OH)	W 64–49	1–0	Comcast Center; College Park, Maryland
November 27	No. 11	The Citadel	W 97–49	2–0	Comcast Center; College Park, Maryland
November 30	No. 11	Duquesne	W 89–39	3–0	Comcast Center; College Park, Maryland
December 3	No. 9	vs. No. 10 Indiana; ACC–Big Ten Challenge	L 74–80 ^{OT}	3–1	Conseco Fieldhouse; Indianapolis
December 7	No. 9	vs. Notre Dame; BB&T Classic	L 67–79	3–2	MCI Center; Washington, D.C.
December 8	No. 9	vs. George Washington; BB&T Classic	W 93–82	4–2	MCI Center; Washington, D.C.
December 14	No. 18	No. 14 Florida	L 64–69	4–3	Comcast Center; College Park, Maryland
December 23	No. 23	UMBC	W 101–60	5–3	Comcast Center; College Park, Maryland
December 29	No. 23	Georgia Tech	W 84–77	6–3 (1–0)	Comcast Center; College Park, Maryland
January 4	No. 22	Wagner	W 79–57	7–3	Comcast Center; College Park, Maryland
January 8	No. 21	Hampton	W 108–58	8–3	Comcast Center; College Park, Maryland
January 11	No. 21	Florida State	W 89–62	9–3 (2–0)	Comcast Center; College Park, Maryland
January 15	No. 17	at No. 19 Wake Forest	L 72–81	9–4 (2–1)	Lawrence Joel Veterans Memorial Coliseum; Winston-Salem, North Carolina
January 18	No. 17	No. 1 Duke	W 87–72	10–4 (3–1)	Comcast Center; College Park, Maryland
January 22	No. 12	at North Carolina	W 81–66	11–4 (4–1)	Dean E. Smith Center; Chapel Hill, North Carolina
January 25	No. 12	at Clemson	W 52–47	12–4 (5–1)	Littlejohn Coliseum; Clemson, South Carolina
January 30	No. 10	NC State	W 75–60	13–4 (6–1)	Comcast Center; College Park, Maryland
February 2	No. 10	Loyola (MD)	W 85–58	14–4	Comcast Center; College Park, Maryland
February 6	No. 8	Virginia	L 78–86	14–5 (6–2)	Comcast Center; College Park, Maryland
February 9 CBS	No. 8	at Georgia Tech	L 84–90	14-6 (6–3)	Alexander Memorial Coliseum; Atlanta
February 12	No. 16	at Florida State	W 74–72	15–6 (7–3)	Donald L. Tucker Civic Center; Tallahassee, Florida
February 17	No. 13	No. 10 Wake Forest	W 90–67	16–6 (8–3)	Comcast Center; College Park, Maryland
February 19	No. 13	at No. 8 Duke	L 70–75	16–7 (8–4)	Cameron Indoor Stadium; Durham, North Carolina
February 22	No. 13	North Carolina	W 96–56	17–7 (9–4)	Comcast Center; College Park, Maryland
February 25	No. 14	Clemson	W 91–52	18–7 (10–4)	Comcast Center; College Park, Maryland
March 2	No. 14	at NC State	W 68–65	19–7 (11–4)	RBC Center; Raleigh, North Carolina
March 9	No. 13	at Virginia	L 78–80 ^{OT}	19–8 (11–5)	University Hall; Charlottesville, Virginia
ACC Tournament
March 14	No. 14	at vs. North Carolina	L 72–84	19–9	Greensboro Coliseum; Greensboro, North Carolina
NCAA Tournament
March 21; CBS	No. 17	vs. UNC Wilmington; First Round	W 75–73	20–9	Gaylord Entertainment Center; Nashville, Tennessee
March 23; CBS	No. 17	vs. No. 12 Xavier; Second Round	W 77–64	21–9	Gaylord Entertainment Center; Nashville, Tennessee
March 28; CBS	No. 17	vs. Michigan State; Sweet Sixteen	L 58–60	21–10	Alamodome; San Antonio, Texas
*Non-conference game. ^{#}Rankings from AP Poll. (#) Tournament seedings in parentheses.
