= 2002–03 Duke Blue Devils men's basketball team =

American college basketball season

2002–03 Duke Blue Devils men's basketball

ACC tournament champions

NCAA tournament, Sweet Sixteen
- Conference: Atlantic Coast Conference

Ranking
- Coaches: No. 9
- AP: No. 7
- Record: 26–7 (11–5 ACC)
- Head coach: Mike Krzyzewski (23rd season)
- Assistant coach: Johnny Dawkins
- Home arena: Cameron Indoor Stadium

2002–03 ACC men's basketball standings
	Conf.				Overall
Team	W		L	PCT	W		L	PCT
No. 8 Wake Forest	13	–	3	.813	25	–	6	.806
No. 17 Maryland	11	–	5	.688	21	–	10	.677
No. 7 Duke†	11	–	5	.688	26	–	7	.788
NC State	9	–	7	.563	18	–	13	.581
Georgia Tech	7	–	9	.438	16	–	15	.516
Virginia	6	–	10	.375	16	–	16	.500
North Carolina	6	–	10	.375	19	–	16	.543
Clemson	5	–	11	.313	15	–	13	.536
Florida State	4	–	12	.250	14	–	15	.483
† 2003 ACC tournament winner Rankings from AP Poll

The 2002–03 Duke Blue Devils men's basketball team represented Duke University in the 2002–03 NCAA Division I men's basketball season. The head coach was Mike Krzyzewski and the team finished the season with an overall record of 26–7.

== Offseason ==
On April 2, 2002, Krzyzewski announced that Mike Dunleavy Jr. and Chris Duhon would be captains for this season.

However, Dunleavy Jr. would declare for the NBA draft and forego his senior season.

== Schedule and results ==
Date time, TV	Rank^{#}	Opponent^{#}	Result	Record	Site city, state
Regular season
November 23, 2002*	No. 6	Army	W 101–53	1–0	Cameron Indoor Stadium; Durham, North Carolina
November 25, 2002*	No. 6	Davidson	W 95–80	2–0	Cameron Indoor Stadium; Durham, North Carolina
November 30, 2002*; CBS	No. 6	vs. No. 14 UCLA; Wooden Tradition	W 84–73	3–0	Conseco Fieldhouse; Indianapolis, Indiana
December 3, 2002*	No. 4	vs. Ohio State; ACC–Big Ten Challenge	W 91–76	4–0	Greensboro Coliseum; Greensboro, North Carolina
December 7, 2002*; CBS	No. 4	Michigan	W 81–59	5–0	Cameron Indoor Stadium; Durham, North Carolina
December 17, 2002*	No. 3	vs. North Carolina A&T	W 91–57	6–0	Greensboro Coliseum; Greensboro, North Carolina
December 29, 2002*	No. 3	Dayton	W 85–74	7–0	Cameron Indoor Stadium; Durham, North Carolina
January 2, 2003*	No. 3	Fairfield	W 86–58	8–0	Cameron Indoor Stadium; Durham, North Carolina
January 5, 2003	No. 3	at Clemson	W 89–71	9–0 (1–0)	Littlejohn Coliseum; Clemson, South Carolina
January 8, 2003*	No. 1	Georgetown	W 93–86	10–0	Cameron Indoor Stadium; Durham, North Carolina
January 12, 2003	No. 1	No. 17 Wake Forest	W 74–55	11–0 (2–0)	Cameron Indoor Stadium; Durham, North Carolina
January 15, 2003	No. 1	Virginia	W 104–93	12–0 (3–0)	Cameron Indoor Stadium; Durham, North Carolina
January 18, 2003	No. 1	at Maryland; Rivalry	L 72–87	12–1 (3–1)	Comcast Center; College Park, Maryland
January 22, 2003	No. 3	at NC State	L 71–80	12–2 (3–2)	RBC Center; Raleigh, North Carolina
January 25, 2003	No. 3	Georgia Tech	W 91–71	13–2 (4–2)	Cameron Indoor Stadium; Durham, North Carolina
January 30, 2003*	No. 5	Butler	W 80–60	14–2	Cameron Indoor Stadium; Durham, North Carolina
February 2, 2003	No. 5	at Florida State	L 70–75	14–3 (4–3)	Donald L. Tucker Civic Center; Tallahassee, Florida
February 5, 2003	No. 9	North Carolina; Rivalry	W 83–74	15–3 (5–3)	Cameron Indoor Stadium; Durham, North Carolina
February 9, 2003	No. 9	Clemson	W 65–55	16–3 (6–3)	Cameron Indoor Stadium; Durham, North Carolina
February 13, 2003	No. 8	at Wake Forest	L 80–94 ^{2OT}	16–4 (6–4)	LJVM Coliseum; Winston-Salem, North Carolina
February 15, 2003	No. 8	at Virginia	W 78–59	17–4 (7–4)	University Hall; Charlottesville, Virginia
February 19, 2003	No. 8	Maryland	W 75–70	18–4 (8–4)	Cameron Indoor Stadium; Durham, North Carolina
February 22, 2003; CBS	No. 8	NC State	W 79–68	19–4 (9–4)	Cameron Indoor Stadium; Durham, North Carolina
February 26, 2003	No. 6	at Georgia Tech	W 77–58	20–4 (10–4)	Alexander Memorial Coliseum; Atlanta, Georgia
March 2, 2003*; CBS	No. 6	at St. John's	L 71–72	20–5	Madison Square Garden; New York, New York
March 6, 2003	No. 10	Florida State	W 72–56	21–5 (11–4)	Cameron Indoor Stadium; Durham, North Carolina
March 9, 2003; CBS	No. 10	at North Carolina; Rivalry	L 79–82	21–6 (11–5)	Dean Smith Center; Chapel Hill, North Carolina
ACC tournament
March 14, 2003	(3) No. 12	vs. (6) Virginia; Quarterfinals	W 83–76	22–6	Greensboro Coliseum; Greensboro, North Carolina
March 15, 2003	(3) No. 12	vs. (7) North Carolina; Semifinals	W 75–63	23–6	Greensboro Coliseum; Greensboro, North Carolina
March 16, 2003; ESPN	(3) No. 12	vs. (4) NC State; Championship	W 84–77	24–6	Greensboro Coliseum; Greensboro, North Carolina
NCAA tournament
March 20, 2003*; CBS	(3 W) No. 7	vs. (14 W) Colorado State; First Round	W 67–57	25–6	Jon M. Huntsman Center; Salt Lake City, Utah
March 22, 2003*; CBS	(3 W) No. 7	vs. (11 W) Central Michigan; Second Round	W 86–60	26–6	Jon M. Huntsman Center; Salt Lake City, Utah
March 27, 2003*; CBS	(3 W) No. 7	vs. (2 W) No. 6 Kansas; Sweet Sixteen	L 65–69	26–7	Honda Center; Anaheim, California
*Non-conference game. ^{#}Rankings from AP Poll. (#) Tournament seedings in parentheses.
