= 2002–03 North Carolina Tar Heels men's basketball team =

American college basketball season

2002–03 North Carolina Tar Heels men's basketball

Preseason NIT Champions

NIT, Quarterfinals
- Conference: Atlantic Coast Conference
- Record: 19–16 (6–10 ACC)
- Head coach: Matt Doherty (3rd season)
- Assistant coaches: Bob MacKinnon Jr. (3rd season); Fred Quartlebaum (3rd season); Doug Wojcik (3rd season)
- Captains: Jonathan Holmes; Will Johnson
- Home arena: Dean Smith Center

2002–03 ACC men's basketball standings
	Conf.				Overall
Team	W		L	PCT	W		L	PCT
No. 8 Wake Forest	13	–	3	.813	25	–	6	.806
No. 17 Maryland	11	–	5	.688	21	–	10	.677
No. 7 Duke†	11	–	5	.688	26	–	7	.788
NC State	9	–	7	.563	18	–	13	.581
Georgia Tech	7	–	9	.438	16	–	15	.516
Virginia	6	–	10	.375	16	–	16	.500
North Carolina	6	–	10	.375	19	–	16	.543
Clemson	5	–	11	.313	15	–	13	.536
Florida State	4	–	12	.250	14	–	15	.483
† 2003 ACC tournament winner Rankings from AP Poll

The 2002–03 North Carolina Tar Heels men's basketball team represented the University of North Carolina at Chapel Hill during the 2002–03 NCAA Division I men's basketball season. Their head coach was Matt Doherty. The team captains for this season were Jonathan Holmes and Will Johnson. The team played its home games in the Dean Smith Center in Chapel Hill, North Carolina as a member of the Atlantic Coast Conference.

== Roster ==
1	Melvin Scott Baltimore, MD (Southern)	SG	SO	6-1, 179
2	Raymond Felton Latta, SC (Latta)	PG	FR	6-0, 194
5	Jackie Manuel West Palm Beach, FL (Cardinal Newman)	SG	SO	6-5, 189
14	Jonathan Holmes Bloomington, IN (Bloomington South)	PG	SR	6-0, 189
15	Damien Price Greensboro, NC (Dudley)	G	JR	5-11, 190
21	Jawad Williams Lakewood, OH (St. Edward)	PF	SO	6-8, 204
25	Damion Grant Wolfeboro, NH (Brewster Academy)	C	FR	6-11, 262
30	Phillip McLamb Charlotte, NC (Country Day)	F	JR	6-6, 216
31	Jonathan Miller Burlington, NC (Williams)	G	JR	6-2, 192
32	Rashad McCants Asheville, NC (The New Hampton School)	SF	FR	6-4, 201
34	David Noel Durham, NC (Southern)	SF	FR	6-6, 216
41	Byron Sanders Gulfport, MS (Harrison Central)	PF	FR	6-9, 225
42	Sean May Bloomington, IN (Bloomington North)	C	FR	6-8, 272
44	Will Johnson Hickory, NC (Hickory)	SF	SR	6-8, 218

2002–03 North Carolina Tar Heels men's basketball team
Players
Coaches

Pos.	#	Name	Height	Weight	Year	Previous school	Hometown
G	1	Melvin Scott	6 ft 2 in (1.88 m)	179 lb (81 kg)	So	Southern	Baltimore, Maryland
G	2	Raymond Felton	6 ft 0 in (1.83 m)	194 lb (88 kg)	Fr	Latta	Latta, South Carolina
G	5	Jackie Manuel	6 ft 5 in (1.96 m)	189 lb (86 kg)	So	Cardinal Newman	West Palm Beach, Florida
G	14	Jonathan Holmes (C)	6 ft 0 in (1.83 m)	189 lb (86 kg)	Sr	Bloomington South	Bloomington, Indiana
G	15	Damien Price	5 ft 11 in (1.8 m)	190 lb (86 kg)	Jr	Dudley	Greensboro, North Carolina
F	21	Jawad Williams	6 ft 9 in (2.06 m)	204 lb (93 kg)	So	St. Edward	Cleveland, Ohio
C	25	Damion Grant	6 ft 11 in (2.11 m)	262 lb (119 kg)	Fr	Brewster Academy	Portland, Jamaica
F	30	Phillip McLamb	6 ft 6 in (1.98 m)	215 lb (98 kg)	Jr	Charlotte Country Day	Charlotte, North Carolina
G	31	Jonathan Miller	6 ft 1 in (1.85 m)	190 lb (86 kg)	Jr	Williams	Burlington, North Carolina
G/F	32	Rashad McCants	6 ft 4 in (1.93 m)	201 lb (91 kg)	Fr	New Hampton Prep	Asheville, North Carolina
G/F	34	David Noel (W)	6 ft 6 in (1.98 m)	216 lb (98 kg)	Fr	Southern Durham	Durham, North Carolina
F	41	Byron Sanders	6 ft 9 in (2.06 m)	225 lb (102 kg)	Fr	Harrison Central	Gulfport, Mississippi
F/C	42	Sean May	6 ft 8 in (2.03 m)	272 lb (123 kg)	Fr	Bloomington North	Bloomington, Indiana
F	44	Will Johnson (C,W)	6 ft 8 in (2.03 m)	218 lb (99 kg)	Sr	Hickory	Hickory, North Carolina

Head coach

Matt Doherty

Assistant coach(es)

Doug Wojcik, Fred Quartlebaum, Bob MacKinnon

Legend

- (C) Team captain
- (S) Suspended
- (I) Ineligible
- (W) Walk-on
- Injured
- Current redshirt

Roster
Last update: April 5, 2017

== Schedule and results ==
The Tar Heels' preseason began with their annual Blue-White Scrimmage. The attendance at the scrimmage was 14,125 people, the most people at one of the Blue-White Scrimmages at that time.

Between games in the Preseason NIT, the Tar Heels played, and won, in the first game held in Old Dominion University's Ted Constant Convocation Center.

The Tar Heels would go on to win that season's Preseason NIT, defeating Kansas, then ranked number two in the AP Poll, and Stanford in the process. By the time the Tar Heels won over Stanford, they had their best start to a season since the 1998-99 season, when the Tar Heels started out with an 8-0 record.

The Tar Heels did not fare as well in the ECAC Holiday Festival, getting upset by Iona in the first game. Iona's win against the Tar Heels was the first time Iona won over a ranked team in 23 years. The Tar Heels recovered in the second game, winning against St. John's. After the ECAC Holiday Festival, the Tar Heels would not appear in any other AP Polls that season.

In addition to the first game held at the Constant Center, the Tar Heels played the first game at what was then known as the University of Miami's Convocation Center. That game ended in an overtime loss for the Tar Heels.

Several records involving three-point attempts were set this season. Thirty-five three-point attempts were made in the game against Davidson, setting a program record of three-point attempts made in a single game. The Tar Heels would come close to matching that record later that season against Wake Forest in the Dean Smith Center and Clemson at Littlejohn Coliseum. That season, North Carolina recorded 822 three-point field goal attempts and 290 made three-point baskets, both program records.

The team's 40-point loss on the road at Maryland became the third largest margin of defeat in the program's history, after a 43-point loss against Lynchburg Elks in 1915 and a 42-point loss against Kentucky in 1950.

Despite a winning record at the start of this season, the Tar Heels finished conference play with a 6–10 record. The Tar Heels needed a win in the 2003 ACC men's basketball tournament to advance to the NCAA Division I men's basketball tournament. The Tar Heels fell short of this goal, defeating Maryland in the quarterfinals but falling to Duke in the semifinals.

The Tar Heels' then 17–15 record was good enough for the 2003 National Invitation Tournament. After defeating DePaul and Wyoming, the Tar Heels would fall to Georgetown in the quarterfinals with a 19–16 record.

The 16 losses in this season were the second most losses in the program's history at the time. The record would be broken by the 2009-10 season with 17 losses. The number of losses in the 2009-10 and 2002-03 seasons rank second and third, respectively, after the record set the previous season.

Days after the end of the Tar Heels' NIT campaign, Doherty resigned as head coach on April 1, 2003. On April 14, 2003, Roy Williams would become the next head coach of the Tar Heels men's basketball team.

Date time, TV	Rank^{#}	Opponent^{#}	Result	Record	High points	High rebounds	High assists	Site (attendance) city, state
November 2, 2002*; 5:30 pm		Blue-White Game; Scrimmage						Dean Smith Center (14,125); Chapel Hill, NC
November 9, 2002*; 4:30 pm		EA Sports Southeast All-Stars; Exhibition	W 109 - 97	0-0	23 – Tied	9 – Williams	9 – Felton	Dean Smith Center (12,574); Chapel Hill, NC
November 13, 2002*; 7:30pm		Team Nike; Exhibition	L 72 - 76	0-0	23 – May	11 – May	5 – Felton	Dean Smith Center (8,450); Chapel Hill, NC
November 18, 2002*; 7:30, ESPN2		Penn State; Preseason NIT	W 85-55	1-0	28 – McCants	10 – May	10 – Felton	Dean Smith Center (16,282); Chapel Hill, NC
November 20, 2002*; 7:00 pm		Rutgers; Preseason NIT	W 71-67	2-0	19 – May	10 – May	9 – Felton	Dean Smith Center (14,656); Chapel Hill, NC
November 24, 2002*; 1:00 pm, RSN		at Old Dominion	W 67-59	3-0	18 – Williams	8 – May	5 – Felton	Constant Center (8,424); Norfolk, VA
November 27, 2002*; 9:00 pm, ESPN		vs. No. 2 Kansas; Preseason NIT – semifinal	W 67-56	4-0	25 – McCants	11 – May	4 – Felton	Madison Square Garden (10,758); New York, NY
November 29, 2002*; 9:00 pm, ESPN		vs. Stanford; Preseason NIT - Championship	W 74-57	5-0	18 – McCants	7 – Tied	7 – Felton	Madison Square Garden (11,718); New York, NY
December 3, 2002*; 9:30 pm, ESPN2	No. 12	at No. 25 Illinois	L 65-92	5-1	21 – May	8 – Tied	3 – Tied	Assembly Hall (16,500); Champaign, IL
December 7, 2002*; 2:00 pm, ESPN	No. 12	No. 18 Kentucky; Rivalry	L 81-98	5-2	22 – McCants	10 – May	7 – Felton	Dean Smith Center (21,750); Chapel Hill, NC
December 19, 2002*; 7:00 pm, RSN	No. 23	Vermont	W 80-54	6-2	19 – McCants	7 – Manuel	8 – Felton	Dean Smith Center (16,258); Chapel Hill, NC
December 22, 2002; 8:00 pm, Fox Sports	No. 23	at Florida State	W 69-48	7-2 (1-0)	16 – Williams	10 – May	11 – Felton	Tallahassee Civic Center (7,102); Tallahassee, FL
December 27, 2002*; 6:30 pm, MSG	No. 22	vs. Iona; ECAC Holiday Festival	L 56-65	7-3	15 – McCants	9 – May	5 – Felton	Madison Square Garden (11,000); New York, NY
December 28, 2002*; 3:00 pm, MSG	No. 22	vs. St. John's (NY); ECAC Holiday Festival	W 63-59	8-3	21 – McCants	10 – Williams	9 – Felton	Madison Square Garden (11,000); New York, NY
January 4, 2003*; 7:00 pm, ESPN		at Miami (FL)	L 61-64 ^{OT}	8-4	14 – McCants	7 – Tied	6 – Felton	Convocation Center (6,826); Coral Gables, FL
January 8, 2003*; 8:30 pm, RJ		Davidson	W 79-64	9-4	19 – McCants	7 – Tied	5 – Felton	Dean Smith Center (18,555); Chapel Hill, NC
January 11, 2003; 12:00 pm, ESPN		Virginia	L 72-79	9-5 (1-1)	18 – Williams	9 – Williams	5 – Felton	University Hall (8,392); Charlottesville, VA
January 14, 2003; 7:00 pm, RSN		Clemson	W 68-66	10-5 (2-1)	20 – McCants	6 – Tied	8 – Felton	Dean Smith Center (17,451); Chapel Hill, NC
January 18, 2003*; 5:00 pm, ESPN		No. 6 Connecticut	W 68-65	11-5	27 – McCants	6 – Tied	7 – Felton	Dean Smith Center (21,750); Chapel Hill, NC
January 22, 2003; 7:00 pm, ESPN		No. 12 Maryland	L 66-81	11-6 (2-2)	26 – McCants	8 – McCants	6 – Felton	Dean Smith Center (21,750); Chapel Hill, NC
January 26, 2003; 2:00 pm, Fox Sports		at NC State; Carolina–State Game	L 77-86	11-7 (2-3)	28 – Felton	10 – McCants	5 – Felton	RBC Center (19,722); Raleigh, NC
January 29, 2003; 7:00 pm, ESPN		at Georgia Tech	L 68-88	11-8 (2-4)	24 – Williams	10 – Williams	6 – Felton	Alexander Coliseum (9,191); Atlanta, GA
February 2, 2003; 5:30, Fox Sports		No. 17 Wake Forest	L 75-79	11-9 (2-5)	22 – Williams	8 – Noel	4 – Williams	Dean Smith Center (21,750); Chapel Hill, NC
February 5, 2003; 9:00 pm, ESPN		at No. 9 Duke; Carolina–Duke rivalry	L 74-83	11-10 (2-6)	25 – Felton	8 – Williams	4 – Tied	Cameron Indoor Stadium (9,314); Durham, NC
February 8, 2003; 1:00 pm, RJ		Florida State	W 61-60	12-10 (3-6)	20 – Williams	7 – Felton	6 – Felton	Dean Smith Center (21,750); Chapel Hill, NC
February 12, 2003; 7:00 pm, ESPN		Virginia	W 81-67	13-10 (4-6)	21 – Tied	9 – Manuel	5 – Tied	Dean Smith Center (20,445); Chapel Hill, NC
February 15, 2003; 1:00 pm, RJ		at Clemson	L 77-80	13-11 (4-7)	19 – Felton	4 – Tied	7 – Felton	Littlejohn Coliseum (10,500); Clemson, SC
February 18, 2003*; 8:00 pm, RJ		North Carolina A&T	W 93-57	14-11	16 – McCants	8 – Noel	11 – Felton	Dean Smith Center (14,005); Chapel Hill, NC
February 22, 2003; 2:00 pm, RJ		at No. 13 Maryland	L 56-96	14-12 (4-8)	12 – Scott	6 – Tied	6 – Williams	Comcast Center (17,950); College Park, MD
February 25, 2003; 9:00 pm, RJ		NC State; Carolina–State Game	L 67-75 ^{OT}	14-13 (4-9)	16 – Tied	7 – Williams	5 – Manuel	Dean Smith Center (21,750); Chapel Hill, NC
March 1, 2003; 1:00 pm, ABC		Georgia Tech	W 67-66	15-13 (5-9)	19 – Felton	9 – Williams	5 – Felton	Dean Smith Center (20,859); Chapel Hill, NC
March 5, 2003; 9:00 pm, RJ		at No. 9 Wake Forest	L 60-75	15-14 (5-10)	17 – Williams	6 – Tied	4 – Felton	LJVM Coliseum (14,656); Winston-Salem, NC
March 9, 2003; 4:00 pm, CBS		No. 10 Duke; Carolina–Duke rivalry	W 82-79	16-14 (6-10)	26 – McCants	8 – Felton	10 – Felton	Dean Smith Center (21,750); Chapel Hill, NC
ACC Tournament
March 14, 2003; 7:00 pm, ESPN2	(7)	vs. (2) No. 14 Maryland; Quarterfinals	W 84-72	17-14	25 – Williams	11 – McCants	10 – Felton	Greensboro Coliseum (23,745); Greensboro, NC
March 15, 2003; 4:00 pm, ESPN	(7)	vs. (3) No. 12 Duke; Semifinals/Rivalry	L 63-75	17-15	18 – Felton	8 – Williams	5 – Felton	Greensboro Coliseum (23,745); Greensboro, NC
NIT
March 18, 2003; 9:00 pm, ESPN		DePaul; First Round	W 83-72	18-15	21 – Noel	11 – Noel	9 – Felton	Dean Smith Center (10,345); Chapel Hill, NC
March 24, 2003; 8:00 pm		Wyoming; Second Round	W 90-74	19-15	20 – Tied	7 – Noel	14 – Felton	Dean Smith Center (20,235); Chapel Hill, NC
March 26, 2003; 7:00 pm, ESPN2		Georgetown; Quarterfinals	L 74-79	19-16	26 – McCants	7 – Williams	11 – Felton	Dean Smith Center (15,043); Chapel Hill, NC
*Non-conference game. ^{#}Rankings from AP Poll. (#) Tournament seedings in parentheses. All times are in EST.
