= 2002–03 Georgia Tech Yellow Jackets men's basketball team =

American college basketball season

2002–03 Georgia Tech Yellow Jackets men's basketball

NIT, Quarterfinals
- Conference: Atlantic Coast Conference
- Record: 16–15 (7–9 ACC)
- Head coach: Paul Hewitt (3rd season)
- Home arena: McCamish Pavilion

2002–03 ACC men's basketball standings
	Conf.				Overall
Team	W		L	PCT	W		L	PCT
No. 8 Wake Forest	13	–	3	.813	25	–	6	.806
No. 17 Maryland	11	–	5	.688	21	–	10	.677
No. 7 Duke†	11	–	5	.688	26	–	7	.788
NC State	9	–	7	.563	18	–	13	.581
Georgia Tech	7	–	9	.438	16	–	15	.516
Virginia	6	–	10	.375	16	–	16	.500
North Carolina	6	–	10	.375	19	–	16	.543
Clemson	5	–	11	.313	15	–	13	.536
Florida State	4	–	12	.250	14	–	15	.483
† 2003 ACC tournament winner Rankings from AP Poll

The 2002–03 Georgia Tech Yellow Jackets men's basketball team represented the Georgia Institute of Technology in the 2002–03 season. Led by head coach Paul Hewitt and freshman forward Chris Bosh, the Jackets finished the regular season with a 14–13 record, before losing to North Carolina State in the 2003 ACC tournament. Bosh averaged 15.6 points and 9 rebounds per game. After accepting an invitation to the 2003 National Invitation Tournament, the Jackets made their way to the quarterfinals, where they fell to Texas Tech. Following the season, Bosh was selected as the fourth overall pick in the 2003 NBA draft, which also included future teammates Dwyane Wade and LeBron James.

== Roster ==
2002–03 Georgia Tech Yellow Jackets men's basketball team
Players
Coaches

Pos.	#	Name	Height	Weight	Year	Hometown
G	1	B. J. Elder	6 ft 4 in (1.93 m)	218 lb (99 kg)	So	Madison, GA
F	2	Isma'il Muhammad	6 ft 6 in (1.98 m)	228 lb (103 kg)	So	Atlanta, GA
G	3	Jarrett Jack	6 ft 3 in (1.91 m)	200 lb (91 kg)	Fr	Fort Washington, MD
F	4	Chris Bosh	6 ft 10 in (2.08 m)	210 lb (95 kg)	Fr	Dallas, TX
F		David Ewing	6 ft 5 in (1.96 m)	235 lb (107 kg)	Sr	Stone Mountain, GA
G	5	Mario West	6 ft 5 in (1.96 m)	210 lb (95 kg)	Fr	Douglasville, GA
F	10	Jim Nyström	6 ft 4 in (1.93 m)	210 lb (95 kg)	Fr	Stockholm, Sweden
C	12	Luke Schenscher	7 ft 1 in (2.16 m)	255 lb (116 kg)	So	Canberra, Australia
G	24	Marvin Lewis	6 ft 4 in (1.93 m)	205 lb (93 kg)	Jr	Germantown, MD
F	32	Ed Nelson	6 ft 8 in (2.03 m)	250 lb (113 kg)	So	Fort Lauderdale, FL
F	34	Robert Brooks	6 ft 8 in (2.03 m)	210 lb (95 kg)	Jr	Saginaw, MI
F	42	Clarence Moore	6 ft 5 in (1.96 m)	215 lb (98 kg)	Jr	Norco, LA
F	44	Theodis Tarver	6 ft 9 in (2.06 m)	245 lb (111 kg)	Fr	Monroe, LA
G	51	David Nelson	5 ft 10 in (1.78 m)	165 lb (75 kg)	Jr	Syracuse, NY
G	55	Anthony McHenry	6 ft 7 in (2.01 m)	220 lb (100 kg)	So	Birmingham, AL

Head coach

- Paul Hewitt (St. John Fisher)

Assistant coach(es)

Legend

- (C) Team captain
- (S) Suspended
- (I) Ineligible
- (W) Walk-on
- Injured
- Current redshirt

== Schedule and results ==
Date time, TV	Rank^{#}	Opponent^{#}	Result	Record	Site city, state
Regular season
Nov 23, 2002*		Arkansas-Pine Bluff	W 113–75	1–0	Alexander Memorial Coliseum; Atlanta, Georgia
Nov 27, 2002*		No. 17 Georgia	W 83–77	2–0	Alexander Memorial Coliseum; Atlanta, Georgia
Mar 8, 2003		Clemson	W 66–56	14–13 (7–9)	Alexander Memorial Coliseum; Atlanta, Georgia
ACC tournament
Mar 14, 2003*		at NC State; Quarterfinals	L 65–71	14–14	Greensboro Coliseum; Raleigh, North Carolina
National Invitation Tournament
Mar 19, 2003*		Ohio State; First round	W 72–58	15–14	Alexander Memorial Coliseum; Atlanta, Georgia
Mar 24, 2003*		at Iowa; Second round	W 79–78	16–14	Carver-Hawkeye Arena; Iowa City, Iowa
Mar 26, 2003*		at Texas Tech; Quarterfinals	L 72–80	16–15	United Spirit Arena; Lubbock, Texas
*Non-conference game. ^{#}Rankings from AP Poll. (#) Tournament seedings in parentheses.

== Players in the 2003 NBA draft ==
Round	Pick	Player	NBA club
1	4	Chris Bosh	Toronto Raptors
