= 2002–03 Virginia Cavaliers men's basketball team =

American college basketball season

2002–03 Virginia Cavaliers men's basketball

NIT, Second Round
- Conference: Atlantic Coast Conference
- Record: 16–16 (6–10 ACC)
- Head coach: Pete Gillen (5th season)
- Assistant coaches: Walt Fuller (5th season); Rod Jensen (1st season); Alexis Jensen (1st season)
- Home arena: University Hall

2002–03 ACC men's basketball standings
	Conf.				Overall
Team	W		L	PCT	W		L	PCT
No. 8 Wake Forest	13	–	3	.813	25	–	6	.806
No. 17 Maryland	11	–	5	.688	21	–	10	.677
No. 7 Duke†	11	–	5	.688	26	–	7	.788
NC State	9	–	7	.563	18	–	13	.581
Georgia Tech	7	–	9	.438	16	–	15	.516
Virginia	6	–	10	.375	16	–	16	.500
North Carolina	6	–	10	.375	19	–	16	.543
Clemson	5	–	11	.313	15	–	13	.536
Florida State	4	–	12	.250	14	–	15	.483
† 2003 ACC tournament winner Rankings from AP Poll

The 2002–03 Virginia Cavaliers men's basketball team represented the University of Virginia during the 2002–03 NCAA Division I men's basketball season. The team was led by fifth-year head coach Pete Gillen, and played their home games at University Hall in Charlottesville, Virginia as members of the Atlantic Coast Conference.

== Last season ==
The Cavaliers had a record of 17–12, with a conference record of 7–9. They competed in the first round of the 2002 National Invitation Tournament, where they lost at home in the first round to South Carolina.

== Roster ==
2002–03 Virginia Cavaliers men's basketball team
Players
Coaches

Pos.	#	Name	Height	Weight	Year	Previous school	Hometown
C	4	Nick VanderLaan	6 ft 10 in (2.08 m)	255 lb (116 kg)	RS Jr	St. Thomas More	Sacramento, California
F	5	Derrick Byars	6 ft 7 in (2.01 m)	200 lb (91 kg)	Fr	Ridgeway	Memphis, Tennessee
G	10	Keith Jenifer	6 ft 3 in (1.91 m)	161 lb (73 kg)	So	Towson Catholic/Hargrave Military	Baltimore, Maryland
G	11	Majestic Mapp (C)	6 ft 2 in (1.88 m)	185 lb (84 kg)	RS Jr	St. Raymond	Harlem, New York
G	12	Billy Campbell	6 ft 0 in (1.83 m)	182 lb (83 kg)	Fr	Paideia School	Atlanta, Georgia
G	15	Robert Lodge	6 ft 4 in (1.93 m)	200 lb (91 kg)	Fr	Montrose Christian	Dugbe Ibadan, Nigeria
G	22	Todd Billet	6 ft 0 in (1.83 m)	192 lb (87 kg)	RS Jr	Christian Brothers	Middletown, New Jersey
G	24	Jermaine Harper	6 ft 3 in (1.91 m)	165 lb (75 kg)	So	Blue Ridge	Gardena, California
F/C	30	Jason Rogers (C)	6 ft 11 in (2.11 m)	232 lb (105 kg)	Sr	Robert E. Lee	Staunton, Virginia
F	31	Rob Williams	6 ft 7 in (2.01 m)	205 lb (93 kg)	So	Martinsville	Martinsville, Virginia
G/F	33	Devin Smith	6 ft 5 in (1.96 m)	230 lb (104 kg)	So	William Penn	New Castle, Delaware
F	34	Jason Clark	6 ft 8 in (2.03 m)	234 lb (106 kg)	So	Hargrave Military	Virginia Beach, Virginia
F/C	35	Travis Watson (C)	6 ft 8 in (2.03 m)	255 lb (116 kg)	Sr	Oak Hill	Brookneal, Virginia
F	42	Elton Brown	6 ft 9 in (2.06 m)	270 lb (122 kg)	So	Warwick	Newport News, Virginia
F	44	Greg Harrell-Edge	6 ft 8 in (2.03 m)	216 lb (98 kg)	Sr	Thomas Jefferson	Vienna, Virginia

Head coach

- Pete Gillen (Fairfield)

Assistant coach(es)

- Walt Fuller (Drexel)
- Rod Jensen (Redlands)
- Alexis Sherard (Saint Michael's)

Legend

- (C) Team captain
- (S) Suspended
- (I) Ineligible
- (W) Walk-on
- Injured
- Current redshirt

Roster
Last update: 29 December 2014

== Schedule ==
Date time, TV	Rank^{#}	Opponent^{#}	Result	Record	Site (attendance) city, state
Exhibition game
Nov. 10; 3:00 pm		Big Apple Basketball	W 84–60		University Hall (1,712); Charlottesville, Virginia
Nov. 17; 3:00 pm		One World All-Stars	W 73–57		University Hall (2,145); Charlottesville, Virginia
Regular season
Nov. 22*; 7:30 pm		LIU	W 90–86	1–0	University Hall (8,392); Charlottesville, Virginia
Nov. 25*; 2:00 pm, ESPN		vs. Chaminade; Maui Invitational	W 86–72	2–0	Lahaina Civic Center (2,500); Maui, HI
Nov. 26*; 2:00 pm		vs. No. 15 Kentucky; Maui Invitational	W 75–61	3–0	Lahaina Civic Center (2,500); Maui, HI
Nov. 27*; 9:30 pm, ESPN		vs. No. 19 Indiana; Maui Invitational	L 63-70	3–1	Lahaina Civic Center (2,500); Maui, HI
Dec. 4*; 9:00 pm, ESPN	No. 22	at No. 21 Michigan State; ACC–Big Ten Challenge	L 75-82	3–2	Breslin Student Events Center (14,759); East Lansing, Michigan
Dec. 17*; 7:30 pm		East Tennessee State	W 84–76	4–2	University Hall (7,673); Charlottesville, Virginia
Dec. 19*; 7:30 pm		Gardner–Webb	W 72–65	5–2	University Hall (6,522); Charlottesville, Virginia
Dec. 21*; 8:00 pm		at Rutgers	W 61–57	6–2	The RAC (8,251); Piscataway, New Jersey
Dec. 28*; 2:00 pm, CBS		Georgetown	W 79–75	7–2	University Hall (7,782); Charlottesville, Virginia
Dec. 30*; 7:30 pm		Liberty	W 77–58	8–2	University Hall (6,516); Charlottesville, Virginia
Jan. 2*; 7:30 pm, CSN/Sunshine		Wofford	W 87–65	9–2	University Hall (7,516); Charlottesville, Virginia
Jan. 5; 5:30 pm, FSN		at NC State	L 63-75	9–3 (0–1)	RBC Center (14,718); Raleigh, North Carolina
Jan. 11; Noon, ESPN		North Carolina	W 79–72	10–3 (1–1)	University Hall (8,392); Charlottesville, Virginia
Jan. 15; 7:00 pm, ESPN		at No. 1 Duke	L 93-104	10–4 (1–2)	Cameron Indoor Stadium (9,314); Durham, North Carolina
Jan. 18; 3:00 pm, Raycom		at Clemson	L 77–78	10–5 (1–3)	Littlejohn Coliseum (8,000); Clemson, South Carolina
Jan. 21*; 7:30 pm, ESPN2		at Virginia Tech	L 55-73	10–6 (1–3)	Cassell Coliseum (8,152); Blacksburg, Virginia
Jan. 23; 7:00 pm, ESPN2		No. 17 Wake Forest	W 75–65	11–6 (2–3)	University Hall (7,642); Charlottesville, Virginia
Jan. 29; 7:00 pm		Florida State	W 85–72	12–6 (3–3)	University Hall (8,392); Charlottesville, Virginia
Feb. 1; 4:05 pm, Raycom		at Georgia Tech	L 60–80	12–7 (3–4)	Alexander Memorial Coliseum (8,850); Atlanta
Feb. 6; 9:00 pm, ESPN2		at No. 8 Maryland	W 86–78	13–7 (4–4)	Comcast Center (17,950); College Park, Maryland
Feb. 9; 4:00 pm, Raycom/ESPN		NC State	W 61–58	14–7 (5–4)	University Hall (8,120); Charlottesville, Virginia
Feb. 12; 7:00 pm, ESPN		at North Carolina	L 67-81	14–8 (5–5)	Dean Smith Center (20,445); Chapel Hill, North Carolina
Feb. 15; 9:00 pm, ESPN		No. 8 Duke	L 59-78	14–9 (5–6)	University Hall (8,392); Charlottesville, Virginia
Feb. 18; 8:00 pm, Raycom		Clemson	L 64-73	14–10 (5–7)	University Hall (7,423); Charlottesville, Virginia
Feb. 23; 6:30 pm, FSN		at No. 10 Wake Forest	L 71-75	14–11 (5–8)	LJVM Coliseum (13,682); Winston-Salem, North Carolina
Feb. 26*; 7:00 pm		at Ohio	L 72–78	14–12 (5–8)	Convocation Center (7,281); Athens, Ohio
Mar. 1 Noon, RSN		at Florida State	L 59-73	14–13 (5–9)	Tallahassee-Leon County Civic Center (5,667); Tallahassee, Florida
Mar. 5; 7:00 pm, ESPN		Georgia Tech	L 73-90	14–14 (5–10)	University Hall (7,086); Charlottesville, Virginia
Mar. 9; 8:00 pm, FSN		No. 13 Maryland	W 80–78 ^{OT}	15–14 (6–10)	University Hall (7,301); Charlottesville, Virginia
ACC Tournament
Mar. 14; 9:45 pm, Raycom/ESPN2		No. 12 Duke; ACC Tournament Quarterfinal	L 76-83	15–15	Georgia Dome (23,745); Atlanta
National Invitation Tournament
Mar. 19*; 7:30 pm		Brown; NIT First Round	W 89–73	16–15	University Hall (4,842); Charlottesville, Virginia
Mar. 24*; 7:30 pm		St. John's; NIT Second Round	L 63–73	16–16	Alumni Hall (3,435); Jamaica, New York
*Non-conference game. (#) Tournament seedings in parentheses. All times are in Eastern Time.
