= 2002–03 NC State Wolfpack men's basketball team =

American college basketball season

2002–03 NC State Wolfpack men's basketball

NCAA tournament, first round
- Conference: Atlantic Coast Conference
- Record: 18–13 (9–7 ACC)
- Head coach: Herb Sendek (7th season)
- Home arena: RBC Center

2002–03 ACC men's basketball standings
	Conf.				Overall
Team	W		L	PCT	W		L	PCT
No. 8 Wake Forest	13	–	3	.813	25	–	6	.806
No. 17 Maryland	11	–	5	.688	21	–	10	.677
No. 7 Duke†	11	–	5	.688	26	–	7	.788
NC State	9	–	7	.563	18	–	13	.581
Georgia Tech	7	–	9	.438	16	–	15	.516
Virginia	6	–	10	.375	16	–	16	.500
North Carolina	6	–	10	.375	19	–	16	.543
Clemson	5	–	11	.313	15	–	13	.536
Florida State	4	–	12	.250	14	–	15	.483
† 2003 ACC tournament winner Rankings from AP Poll

The 2002–03 NC State Wolfpack men's basketball team represented North Carolina State University as a member of the Atlantic Coast Conference during the 2002–03 men's college basketball season. It was Herb Sendek's seventh season as head coach. The Wolfpack earned a bid to the NCAA tournament and finished with a record of 18–13 (9–7 ACC).

== Roster ==
2002–03 NC State Wolfpack men's basketball team
Players
Coaches

Pos.	#	Name	Height	Weight	Year	Hometown
F	3	Ilian Evtimov	6 ft 7 in (2.01 m)	220 lb (100 kg)	Fr	Winston-Salem, North Carolina
G	13	Cameron Bennerman	6 ft 4 in (1.93 m)	205 lb (93 kg)	Fr	Greensboro, North Carolina
G	24	Julius Hodge	6 ft 7 in (2.01 m)	210 lb (95 kg)	So
F	33	Josh Powell	6 ft 9 in (2.06 m)	225 lb (102 kg)	So
F	54	Marcus Melvin	6 ft 8 in (2.03 m)	230 lb (104 kg)	Jr	Fayetteville, North Carolina

Head coach

- Herb Sendek (Carnegie Mellon)

Assistant coach(es)

Legend

- (C) Team captain
- (S) Suspended
- (I) Ineligible
- (W) Walk-on
- Injured
- Current redshirt

== Schedule and results ==
Date time, TV	Rank^{#}	Opponent^{#}	Result	Record	Site city, state
Regular Season
Nov 22, 2002*		Mount St. Mary's	W 84–60	1–0	RBC Center; Raleigh, North Carolina
Nov 30, 2002*		Coppin State	W 58–37	2–0	RBC Center; Raleigh, North Carolina
Dec 4, 2002*		Northwestern	W 74–49	3–0	RBC Center; Raleigh, North Carolina
Dec 8, 2002*		South Carolina	W 76–64	4–0	RBC Center; Raleigh, North Carolina
Dec 14, 2002*		North Carolina A&T	W 101–63	5–0	RBC Center; Raleigh, North Carolina
Dec 17, 2002*; 7:00 p.m., ESPN		vs. Gonzaga; Jimmy V Classic	L 60–69	5–1	Continental Airlines Arena (8,867); East Rutherford, New Jersey
Dec 21, 2002*		Fairleigh Dickinson	W 104–65	6–1	RBC Center; Raleigh, North Carolina
Dec 29, 2002*		Wofford	W 86–71	7–1	RBC Center; Raleigh, North Carolina
Jan 2, 2003*		at UMass	L 56–68	7–2	Mullins Center; Amherst, Massachusetts
Jan 5, 2003		Virginia	W 75–63	8–2 (1–0)	RBC Center (14,718); Raleigh, North Carolina
Jan 11, 2003		at Georgia Tech	L 61–85	8–3 (1–1)	Alexander Memorial Coliseum; Atlanta, Georgia
Jan 16, 2003*		Boston College	L 81–93	8–4	RBC Center; Raleigh, North Carolina
Jan 18, 2003		at Florida State	W 70–63	9–4 (2–1)	Tallahassee-Leon County Civic Center; Tallahassee, Florida
Jan 22, 2003		No. 3 Duke	W 80–71	10–4 (3–1)	RBC Center; Raleigh, North Carolina
Jan 26, 2003		North Carolina	W 86–77	11–4 (4–1)	RBC Center; Raleigh, North Carolina
Jan 30, 2003		at No. 10 Maryland	L 60–75	11–5 (4–2)	Comcast Center; College Park, Maryland
Feb 2, 2003		Clemson	W 78–56	12–5 (5–2)	RBC Center; Raleigh, North Carolina
Feb 6, 2003		at No. 14 Wake Forest	L 58–73	12–6 (5–3)	Lawrence Joel Veterans Memorial Coliseum; Winston-Salem, North Carolina
Feb 9, 2003		at Virginia	L 58–61	12–7 (5–4)	University Hall; Charlottesville, Virginia
Feb 12, 2003		Georgia Tech	W 63–57	13–7 (6–4)	RBC Center; Raleigh, North Carolina
Feb 15, 2003*		at Temple	L 54–76	13–8	Liacouras Center; Philadelphia, Pennsylvania
Feb 18, 2003		Florida State	W 71–60	14–8 (7–4)	RBC Center; Raleigh, North Carolina
Feb 22, 2003		at No. 8 Duke	L 68–79	14–9 (7–5)	Cameron Indoor Stadium; Durham, North Carolina
Feb 25, 2003		at North Carolina	W 75–67 ^{OT}	15–9 (8–5)	Dean Smith Center; Chapel Hill, North Carolina
Mar 2, 2003		No. 14 Maryland	L 65–68	15–10 (8–6)	RBC Center; Raleigh, North Carolina
Mar 5, 2003		at Clemson	W 63–60	16–10 (9–6)	Littlejohn Coliseum; Clemson, South Carolina
Mar 8, 2003		No. 9 Wake Forest	L 72–78	16–11 (9–7)	RBC Center; Raleigh, North Carolina
ACC Tournament
Mar 14, 2003*		Georgia Tech; Quarterfinals	W 71–65	17–11	Greensboro Coliseum; Greensboro, North Carolina
Mar 15, 2003*		vs. No. 9 Wake Forest; Semifinals	W 87–83	18–11	Greensboro Coliseum; Greensboro, North Carolina
Mar 16, 2003*		vs. No. 12 Duke; Championship game	L 77–84	18–12	Greensboro Coliseum; Greensboro, North Carolina
NCAA Tournament
Mar 20, 2003*	(9 E)	vs. (8 E) California; First round	L 74–76 ^{OT}	18–13	Ford Center; Oklahoma City, Oklahoma
*Non-conference game. ^{#}Rankings from AP Poll. (#) Tournament seedings in parentheses. E=East. All times are in Eastern Time.
