= 2002–03 Washington State Cougars men's basketball team =

American college basketball season

2002–03 Washington State Cougars men's basketball
- Conference: Pacific-10 Conference
- Record: 7–20 (2–16 Pac-10)
- Head coach: Paul Graham (4th season)
- Home arena: Beasley Coliseum

2002–03 Pacific-10 Conference men's basketball standings
	Conf.				Overall
Team	W		L	PCT	W		L	PCT
No. 5 Arizona	17	–	1	.944	28	–	4	.875
No. 20 Stanford	14	–	4	.778	24	–	9	.727
California	13	–	5	.722	22	–	9	.710
Arizona State	11	–	7	.611	20	–	12	.625
Oregon †	10	–	8	.556	23	–	10	.697
Oregon State	6	–	12	.333	13	–	15	.464
USC	6	–	12	.333	13	–	17	.433
UCLA	6	–	12	.333	10	–	19	.345
Washington	5	–	13	.278	10	–	17	.370
Washington State	2	–	16	.111	7	–	20	.259
† 2003 Pac-10 tournament winner As of July 10, 2011; Rankings from Coaches Poll

The 2002–03 Washington State Cougars men's basketball team represented Washington State University for the 2002–03 NCAA Division I men's basketball season. Led by third-year head coach Paul Graham, the Cougars were members of the Pacific-10 Conference and played their home games on campus at Beasley Coliseum in Pullman, Washington.

The Cougars were 7–20 overall in the regular season and 2–16 in conference play, last in the standings. The conference tournament included only the top eight teams from the standings.

Days after the season ended, Graham was fired; his successor was Dick Bennett, formerly the head coach at Wisconsin.
