= 2002–03 NCAA Division I men's basketball season =

Basketball season

- Preseason AP No. 1: Arizona Wildcats
- Regular season: November 10, 2002– March 16, 2003
- NCAA Tournament: 2003
- Tournament dates: March 17 – April 7, 2003
- National Championship: Louisiana Superdome; New Orleans, Louisiana
- NCAA Champions: Syracuse Orangemen
- Other champions: St. John's Red Storm (NIT)
- Player of the Year (Naismith, Wooden): T. J. Ford, Texas Longhorns

The 2002–03 NCAA Division I men's basketball season began on November 10, 2002, progressed through the regular season and conference tournaments, and concluded with the 2003 NCAA Men's Division I Basketball Tournament Championship Game on April 7, 2003, at the Louisiana Superdome in New Orleans, Louisiana. The Syracuse Orangemen and coach Jim Boeheim won their first NCAA national championship with an 81–78 victory over the Kansas Jayhawks.

== Season headlines ==
- The preseason AP All-American team was named on November 12. David West of Xavier was the leading vote-getter (43 of 72 votes). The rest of the team included Luke Walton (42 votes) and Jason Gardner (39) of Arizona, Kirk Hinrich of Kansas (35) and Erwin Dudley of Alabama (32).
- The National Invitation Tournament (NIT) held its last third-place game between the teams which lost in the semifinals. The tournament included a third-place game from 1938 through 1981 and again from 1984 through 2003.

== Major rule changes ==
Beginning in 2002–03, the following rules changes were implemented:

- Two free-throw lane spaces closest to the free-thrower would remain unoccupied.
- No free throws were awarded to the offended team in bonus for personal fouls committed by a team while in team control or in possession of the ball during a throw-in (team-control foul).

== Season outlook ==
=== Pre-season polls ===
The top 25 from the AP and ESPN/USA Today Coaches Polls November 13, 2002.

Associated Press
Ranking	Team
1	Arizona (50)
2	Kansas (14)
3	Oklahoma (6)
4	Texas
5	Pittsburgh (1)
6	Duke
7	Florida
8	Alabama
9	Michigan State
10	Xavier
11	Oregon
12	Mississippi State (1)
13	Maryland
14	UCLA
15	Connecticut
16	Georgia
17	Kentucky
18	Marquette
19	Missouri
20	Western Kentucky
21	Indiana
22	Gonzaga
23	Cincinnati
24	Minnesota
25	Tulsa

ESPN/USA Today Coaches
Ranking	Team
1	Arizona (27)
2	Kansas (3)
3	Oklahoma (1)
4	Pittsburgh
5	Texas
6	Duke
7	Florida
8	Alabama
9	Oregon
10	Michigan State
11	Xavier
12	UCLA
13	Mississippi State
14	Connecticut
15	Maryland
16	Georgia
17	Kentucky
18	Missouri
19	Marquette
20	Cincinnati
21	Indiana
22	Gonzaga
23	Western Kentucky
24	Minnesota
25	Illinois

== Conference membership changes ==
These schools joined new conferences for the 2002–03 season.

School	Former conference	New conference
Gardner–Webb Runnin' Bulldogs	NCAA Division II independent	Atlantic Sun Conference
Savannah State Tigers	NCAA Division II independent	NCAA Division I independent
Texas A&M–Corpus Christi Islanders	NCAA Division III independent	NCAA Division I independent

== Regular season ==
=== Conferences ===
==== Conference winners and tournaments ====
Conference	Regular season winner	Conference player of the year	Conference tournament	Tournament venue (City)	Tournament winner
America East Conference	Boston University	Taylor Coppenrath, Vermont	2003 America East men's basketball tournament	Walter Brown Arena (Boston, Massachusetts) (Except Finals)	Vermont
Atlantic 10 Conference	St. Joseph's (East); Xavier (West)	David West, Xavier	2003 Atlantic 10 men's basketball tournament	University of Dayton Arena (Dayton, Ohio)	Dayton
Atlantic Coast Conference	Wake Forest	Josh Howard, Wake Forest	2003 ACC men's basketball tournament	Greensboro Coliseum (Greensboro, North Carolina)	Duke
Atlantic Sun Conference	Troy & Mercer	Adam Sonn, Belmont	2003 Atlantic Sun men's basketball tournament	GSU Sports Arena (Atlanta, Georgia)	Troy
Big 12 Conference	Kansas	Nick Collison, Kansas	2003 Big 12 men's basketball tournament	American Airlines Center (Dallas, Texas)	Oklahoma
Big East Conference	Connecticut & Boston College (East); Syracuse & Pittsburgh (West)	Troy Bell, Boston College	2003 Big East men's basketball tournament	Madison Square Garden (New York City, New York)	Pittsburgh
Big Sky Conference	Weber State	Jermaine Boyette, Weber State	2003 Big Sky men's basketball tournament	Dee Events Center (Ogden, Utah) (Semifinals and Finals)	Weber State
Big South Conference	Winthrop	Torrey Butler, Coastal Carolina	2003 Big South Conference men's basketball tournament	Vines Center (Lynchburg, Virginia) (Semifinals and Finals)	UNC Asheville
Big Ten Conference	Wisconsin	Brian Cook, Illinois	2003 Big Ten Conference men's basketball tournament	United Center (Chicago, Illinois)	Illinois
Big West Conference	UC Santa Barbara	Branduinn Fullove, UC Santa Barbara	2003 Big West Conference men's basketball tournament	Anaheim Convention Center (Anaheim, California)	Utah State
Colonial Athletic Association	UNC Wilmington	Brett Blizzard, UNC Wilmington	2003 CAA men's basketball tournament	Richmond Coliseum (Richmond, Virginia)	UNC Wilmington
Conference USA	Marquette	Dwyane Wade, Marquette	2003 Conference USA men's basketball tournament	Freedom Hall (Louisville, Kentucky)	Louisville
Horizon League	Butler	Willie Green, Detroit	2003 Horizon League men's basketball tournament	U.S. Cellular Arena (Milwaukee, Wisconsin) (Except First Round)	Wisconsin-Milwaukee
Ivy League	Penn	Ugonna Onyekwe, Penn	No Tournament		
Metro Atlantic Athletic Conference	Manhattan	Luis Flores, Manhattan	2003 MAAC men's basketball tournament	Sovereign Bank Arena (Trenton, New Jersey)	Manhattan
Mid-American Conference	Kent State (East); Central Michigan (West)	Chris Kaman, Central Michigan	2003 MAC men's basketball tournament	Gund Arena (Cleveland, Ohio)	Central Michigan
Mid-Continent Conference	Valparaiso	Mike Helms, Oakland	2003 Mid-Continent Conference men's basketball tournament	Kemper Arena (Kansas City, Missouri)	IUPUI
Mid-Eastern Athletic Conference	South Carolina State	Ron Williamson, Howard	2003 Mid-Eastern Athletic Conference men's basketball tournament	Richmond Coliseum (Richmond, Virginia)	South Carolina State
Missouri Valley Conference	Southern Illinois	Kyle Korver, Creighton	2003 Missouri Valley Conference men's basketball tournament	Savvis Center (St. Louis, Missouri)	Creighton
Mountain West Conference	Utah & BYU	Ruben Douglas, New Mexico	2003 MWC men's basketball tournament	Thomas & Mack Center (Paradise, Nevada)	Colorado State
Northeast Conference	Wagner	Jermaine Hall, Wagner	2003 Northeast Conference men's basketball tournament	Campus Sites	Wagner
Ohio Valley Conference	Austin Peay & Morehead State	Ricky Minard, Morehead State	2003 Ohio Valley Conference men's basketball tournament	Gaylord Entertainment Center (Nashville, Tennessee) (Semifinals and Finals)	Austin Peay
Pacific-10 Conference	Arizona	Luke Ridnour, Oregon	2003 Pacific-10 Conference men's basketball tournament	Staples Center (Los Angeles, California)	Oregon
Patriot League	Holy Cross	Patrick Whearty, Holy Cross	2003 Patriot League men's basketball tournament	Campus Sites	Holy Cross
Southeastern Conference	Kentucky (East); Mississippi State (West)	Keith Bogans, Kentucky (Coaches); Ron Slay, Tennessee (AP)	2003 SEC men's basketball tournament	Louisiana Superdome (New Orleans, Louisiana)	Kentucky
Southern Conference	East Tennessee State, Appalachian State & Davidson (North); Charleston (South)	Troy Wheless, Charleston	2003 Southern Conference men's basketball tournament	North Charleston Coliseum (North Charleston, South Carolina)	East Tennessee State
Southland Conference	Sam Houston State	Donald Cole, Sam Houston State	2003 Southland Conference men's basketball tournament	Bernard Johnson Coliseum (Huntsville, Texas) (Finals)	Sam Houston State
Southwestern Athletic Conference	Prairie View A&M	Gregory Burks, Prairie View A&M	2003 Southwestern Athletic Conference men's basketball tournament	Fair Park Arena (Birmingham, Alabama)	Texas Southern
Sun Belt Conference	Western Kentucky (East); Louisiana–Lafayette (West)	James Moore, New Mexico State	2003 Sun Belt men's basketball tournament	E. A. Diddle Arena (Bowling Green, Kentucky)	Western Kentucky
West Coast Conference	Gonzaga	Blake Stepp, Gonzaga	2003 West Coast Conference men's basketball tournament	Jenny Craig Pavilion (San Diego, California)	San Diego
Western Athletic Conference	Fresno State	Quinton Ross, Southern Methodist	2003 WAC men's basketball tournament	Reynolds Center (Tulsa, Oklahoma)	Tulsa

==== Conference standings ====
2002–03 America East Conference men's basketball standings
	Conf.				Overall
Team	W		L	PCT	W		L	PCT
Boston University	13	–	3	.813	20	–	11	.645
Vermont †	11	–	5	.688	21	–	12	.636
Hartford	10	–	6	.625	16	–	13	.552
Binghamton	9	–	7	.563	14	–	13	.519
Maine	8	–	8	.500	14	–	16	.467
Northeastern	8	–	8	.500	16	–	15	.516
Stony Brook	7	–	9	.438	13	–	15	.464
Albany	3	–	13	.188	7	–	21	.250
New Hampshire	3	–	13	.188	5	–	23	.179
† 2003 America East tournament winner

2002–03 ACC men's basketball standings
	Conf.				Overall
Team	W		L	PCT	W		L	PCT
No. 8 Wake Forest	13	–	3	.813	25	–	6	.806
No. 17 Maryland	11	–	5	.688	21	–	10	.677
No. 7 Duke†	11	–	5	.688	26	–	7	.788
NC State	9	–	7	.563	18	–	13	.581
Georgia Tech	7	–	9	.438	16	–	15	.516
Virginia	6	–	10	.375	16	–	16	.500
North Carolina	6	–	10	.375	19	–	16	.543
Clemson	5	–	11	.313	15	–	13	.536
Florida State	4	–	12	.250	14	–	15	.483
† 2003 ACC tournament winner Rankings from AP Poll

2002–03 Atlantic 10 men's basketball standings
	Conf.				Overall
Team	W		L	PCT	W		L	PCT
East
Saint Joseph's	12	–	4	.750	23	–	7	.767
Rhode Island	10	–	6	.625	19	–	12	.613
Temple	10	–	6	.625	18	–	16	.529
UMass	6	–	10	.375	11	–	18	.379
Fordham	3	–	13	.188	2	–	26	.071
St. Bonaventure	1	–	15	.063	13	–	14	.481
West
No. 12 Xavier	15	–	1	.938	26	–	6	.813
No. 16 Dayton †	14	–	2	.875	24	–	6	.800
Richmond	10	–	6	.625	15	–	14	.517
La Salle	6	–	10	.375	12	–	17	.414
George Washington	5	–	11	.313	12	–	17	.414
Duquesne	4	–	13	.235	9	–	21	.300
† Atlantic 10 Tournament winner As of February 5, 2016; Rankings from Coaches' Poll

2002–03 Atlantic Sun men's basketball standings
	Conf.				Overall
Team	W		L	PCT	W		L	PCT
North
Belmont	12	–	4	.750	17	–	12	.586
Jacksonville State	10	–	6	.625	20	–	10	.667
Samford	9	–	7	.563	13	–	15	.464
Georgia State	8	–	8	.500	14	–	15	.483
Gardner–Webb	2	–	14	.125	5	–	24	.172
Campbell	1	–	15	.063	5	–	22	.185
South
Troy State †	14	–	2	.875	26	–	6	.813
Mercer	14	–	2	.875	23	–	6	.793
UCF	11	–	5	.688	21	–	11	.656
Jacksonville	8	–	8	.500	13	–	16	.448
Stetson	4	–	12	.250	7	–	20	.259
Florida Atlantic	3	–	13	.188	7	–	21	.250
† 2003 Atlantic Sun Tournament winner As of March 4, 2003; Rankings from AP Poll

2002–03 Big 12 men's basketball standings
	Conf.				Overall
Team	W		L	PCT	W		L	PCT
No. 6 Kansas	14	–	2	.875	30	–	8	.789
No. 5 Texas	13	–	3	.813	26	–	7	.788
No. 3 Oklahoma †	12	–	4	.750	27	–	7	.794
Oklahoma State	10	–	6	.625	22	–	10	.688
No. 24 Missouri	9	–	7	.563	22	–	11	.667
Colorado	9	–	7	.563	20	–	12	.625
Texas Tech	6	–	10	.375	22	–	13	.629
Texas A&M	6	–	10	.375	14	–	14	.500
Iowa State	5	–	11	.313	17	–	14	.548
Baylor	5	–	11	.313	14	–	14	.500
Kansas State	4	–	12	.250	13	–	17	.433
Nebraska	3	–	13	.188	11	–	19	.367
† 2003 Big 12 Tournament winner Rankings from AP poll

2002–03 Big East men's basketball standings
	Conf.				Overall
Team	W		L	PCT	W		L	PCT
East
Boston College	10	–	6	.625	19	–	12	.613
No. 23 Connecticut	10	–	6	.625	23	–	10	.697
Providence	8	–	8	.500	18	–	14	.563
Villanova	8	–	8	.500	15	–	16	.484
St. John's#	7	–	9	.438	1	–	13	.071
Miami	4	–	12	.250	11	–	17	.393
Virginia Tech*	4	–	12	.250	11	–	18	.379
West
No. 13 Syracuse	13	–	3	.813	30	–	5	.857
No. 4 Pittsburgh†	13	–	3	.813	28	–	5	.848
Seton Hall	10	–	6	.625	17	–	13	.567
No. 22 Notre Dame	10	–	6	.625	24	–	10	.706
Georgetown	6	–	10	.375	19	–	15	.559
West Virginia	5	–	11	.313	14	–	15	.483
Rutgers*	4	–	12	.250	12	–	16	.429
† 2003 Big East tournament winner As of March 31, 2003; Rankings from AP Poll #St. John's had 20 regular-season games vacated due to sanctions against the program; the school′s disputed record was 7–9, 21–13. *Did not qualify for 2003 Big East tournament.

2002–03 Big Sky men's basketball standings
	Conf.				Overall
Team	W		L	PCT	W		L	PCT
Weber State †	14	–	0	1.000	26	–	6	.813
Eastern Washington	9	–	5	.643	18	–	13	.581
Idaho State	7	–	7	.500	15	–	14	.517
Montana	7	–	7	.500	13	–	17	.433
Northern Arizona	6	–	8	.429	15	–	13	.536
Sacramento State	5	–	9	.357	12	–	17	.414
Montana State	5	–	9	.357	11	–	16	.407
Portland State	3	–	11	.214	5	–	22	.185
† Conference tournament winner

2002–03 Big South Conference men's basketball standings
	Conf.				Overall
Team	W		L	PCT	W		L	PCT
Winthrop	11	–	3	.786	20	–	10	.667
Charleston Southern	8	–	6	.571	14	–	14	.500
Liberty	8	–	6	.571	14	–	15	.483
Elon	8	–	6	.571	12	–	15	.444
UNC Asheville †	7	–	7	.500	15	–	17	.469
Radford	6	–	8	.429	10	–	20	.333
Coastal Carolina	5	–	9	.357	13	–	15	.464
High Point	3	–	11	.214	7	–	20	.259
† 2003 Big South tournament winner Rankings from AP Poll

2002–03 Big Ten Conference men's basketball standings
	Conf.				Overall
Team	W		L	PCT	W		L	PCT
No. 21 Wisconsin	12	–	4	.750	24	–	8	.750
No. 11 Illinois †	11	–	5	.688	25	–	7	.781
Purdue	10	–	6	.625	19	–	11	.633
Michigan State	10	–	6	.625	22	–	13	.629
Michigan	10	–	6	.625	18	–	12	.600
Indiana	8	–	8	.500	21	–	13	.618
Minnesota	8	–	8	.500	19	–	14	.576
Iowa	7	–	9	.438	17	–	14	.548
Ohio State	7	–	9	.438	17	–	15	.531
Northwestern	3	–	13	.188	12	–	17	.414
Penn State	2	–	14	.125	7	–	21	.250
† 2003 Big Ten tournament winner Rankings from AP poll

2002–03 Big West men's basketball standings
	Conf.				Overall
Team	W		L	PCT	W		L	PCT
UC Santa Barbara	14	–	4	.778	18	–	14	.563
UC Irvine	13	–	5	.722	20	–	9	.690
Utah State†	12	–	6	.667	24	–	9	.727
Cal Poly	10	–	8	.556	16	–	14	.533
Idaho	9	–	9	.500	13	–	15	.464
Cal State Fullerton	8	–	10	.444	10	–	19	.345
Cal State Northridge	8	–	10	.444	14	–	15	.483
Pacific	7	–	11	.389	12	–	16	.429
UC Riverside	5	–	13	.278	6	–	18	.250
Long Beach State	4	–	14	.222	5	–	22	.185
† 2003 Big West tournament winner As of April 10, 2003; Rankings from AP poll

2002–03 CAA men's basketball standings
	Conf.				Overall
Team	W		L	PCT	W		L	PCT
UNC Wilmington †	15	–	3	.833	24	–	7	.774
VCU	12	–	6	.667	18	–	10	.643
Drexel	12	–	6	.667	19	–	12	.613
George Mason	11	–	7	.611	16	–	12	.571
Delaware	9	–	9	.500	15	–	14	.517
Old Dominion	9	–	9	.500	12	–	15	.444
James Madison	8	–	10	.444	13	–	17	.433
William & Mary	7	–	11	.389	12	–	16	.429
Hofstra	6	–	12	.333	8	–	21	.276
Towson	1	–	17	.056	4	–	24	.143
† 2003 CAA tournament winner Rankings from AP poll

2002–03 Conference USA men's basketball standings
	Conf.				Overall
Team	W		L	PCT	W		L	PCT
American
No. 9 Marquette	14	–	2	.875	27	–	6	.818
No. 14 Louisville †	11	–	5	.688	25	–	7	.781
Cincinnati	9	–	7	.563	17	–	12	.586
Saint Louis	9	–	7	.563	16	–	14	.533
DePaul	8	–	8	.500	16	–	13	.552
Charlotte	8	–	8	.500	13	–	16	.448
East Carolina	3	–	13	.188	12	–	15	.444
National
No. 19 Memphis	13	–	3	.813	23	–	7	.767
UAB	8	–	8	.500	21	–	13	.618
Tulane	8	–	8	.500	16	–	15	.516
South Florida	7	–	9	.438	15	–	14	.517
Houston	6	–	10	.375	8	–	20	.286
Southern Miss	5	–	11	.313	13	–	16	.448
TCU	3	–	13	.188	9	–	19	.321
† 2003 Conference USA Tournament winner Rankings from AP Poll

2002–03 Horizon League men's basketball standings
	Conf.				Overall
Team	W		L	PCT	W		L	PCT
Butler	14	–	2	.875	27	–	6	.818
Milwaukee †	13	–	3	.813	24	–	8	.750
Illinois-Chicago	12	–	4	.750	21	–	9	.700
Loyola Chicago	9	–	7	.563	15	–	16	.484
Detroit Mercy	9	–	7	.563	18	–	12	.600
Green Bay	4	–	12	.250	10	–	20	.333
Youngstown State	4	–	12	.250	9	–	20	.310
Wright State	4	–	12	.250	10	–	18	.357
Cleveland State	3	–	13	.188	8	–	22	.267
† 2003 Horizon League Tournament winner

2002–03 Ivy League men's basketball standings
	Conf.				Overall
Team	W		L	PCT	W		L	PCT
Penn	14	–	0	1.000	22	–	6	.786
Brown	12	–	2	.857	17	–	12	.586
Princeton	10	–	4	.714	16	–	11	.593
Yale	8	–	6	.571	14	–	13	.519
Harvard	4	–	10	.286	12	–	15	.444
Cornell	4	–	10	.286	9	–	18	.333
Dartmouth	4	–	10	.286	8	–	19	.296
Columbia	0	–	14	.000	2	–	25	.074
Rankings from AP Poll

2002–03 MAAC men's basketball standings
	Conf.				Overall
Team	W		L	PCT	W		L	PCT
Manhattan †	14	–	4	.778	23	–	7	.767
Fairfield	13	–	5	.722	19	–	12	.613
Siena	12	–	6	.667	21	–	11	.656
Niagara	12	–	6	.667	17	–	12	.586
Iona	11	–	7	.611	17	–	12	.586
Marist	8	–	10	.444	13	–	16	.448
Rider	7	–	11	.389	12	–	16	.429
Saint Peter's	6	–	12	.333	10	–	19	.345
Canisius	6	–	12	.333	10	–	18	.357
Loyola (MD)	1	–	17	.056	4	–	24	.143
† 2003 MAAC tournament winner

2002–03 Mid-American Conference men's basketball standings
	Conf.				Overall
Team	W		L	PCT	W		L	PCT
East
Kent State	12	–	6	.667	21	–	10	.677
Miami (OH)	11	–	7	.611	13	–	15	.464
Akron	9	–	9	.500	14	–	14	.500
Marshall	9	–	9	.500	14	–	15	.483
Ohio	8	–	10	.444	14	–	16	.467
Buffalo	2	–	16	.111	5	–	23	.179
West
Central Michigan †	14	–	4	.778	25	–	7	.781
Northern Illinois	11	–	7	.611	17	–	14	.548
Western Michigan	10	–	8	.556	20	–	11	.645
Eastern Michigan	8	–	10	.444	14	–	14	.500
Bowling Green	8	–	10	.444	13	–	16	.448
Ball State	8	–	10	.444	13	–	17	.433
Toledo	7	–	11	.389	14	–	15	.483
† 2003 MAC tournament winner Rankings from AP Poll

2002–03 Mid-Continent Conference men's basketball standings
	Conf.				Overall
Team	W		L	PCT	W		L	PCT
Valparaiso	12	–	2	.857	20	–	11	.645
IUPUI †	10	–	4	.714	20	–	14	.588
Oakland	10	–	4	.714	17	–	11	.607
Oral Roberts	9	–	5	.643	18	–	10	.643
UMKC	7	–	7	.500	9	–	20	.310
Southern Utah	5	–	9	.357	11	–	17	.393
Western Illinois	3	–	11	.214	7	–	21	.250
Chicago State	0	–	14	.000	3	–	27	.100
† 2003 Mid-Con Tournament winner Rankings from AP Poll

2002–03 MEAC men's basketball standings
	Conf.				Overall
Team	W		L	PCT	W		L	PCT
South Carolina State †	15	–	3	.833	20	–	11	.645
Hampton	13	–	5	.722	19	–	11	.633
Delaware State	13	–	5	.722	15	–	12	.556
Florida A&M	11	–	7	.611	17	–	12	.586
Coppin State	11	–	7	.611	11	–	17	.393
Norfolk State	10	–	8	.556	14	–	15	.483
Howard	9	–	9	.500	13	–	17	.433
Morgan State	6	–	12	.333	7	–	22	.241
Bethune–Cookman	5	–	13	.278	8	–	22	.267
Maryland Eastern Shore	5	–	13	.278	5	–	23	.179
North Carolina A&T	1	–	17	.056	1	–	26	.037
† 2003 MEAC tournament winner Rankings from AP Poll

2002–03 Missouri Valley Conference men's basketball standings
	Conf.				Overall
Team	W		L	PCT	W		L	PCT
Southern Illinois	16	–	2	.889	24	–	7	.774
No. 15 Creighton †	15	–	3	.833	29	–	5	.853
Wichita State	12	–	6	.667	18	–	12	.600
Southwest Missouri State	12	–	6	.667	17	–	12	.586
Evansville	8	–	10	.444	12	–	16	.429
Bradley	8	–	10	.444	12	–	18	.400
Northern Iowa	7	–	11	.389	11	–	17	.393
Drake	5	–	13	.278	10	–	20	.333
Illinois State	5	–	13	.278	8	–	21	.276
Indiana State	2	–	16	.111	7	–	24	.226
† 2003 MVC tournament winner Rankings from AP Poll

2002–03 Mountain West Conference men's basketball standings
	Conf.				Overall
Team	W		L	PCT	W		L	PCT
Utah	11	–	3	.786	25	–	8	.758
BYU	11	–	3	.786	23	–	9	.719
Wyoming	8	–	6	.571	21	–	11	.656
UNLV	8	–	6	.571	21	–	11	.656
San Diego State	6	–	8	.429	16	–	14	.533
Colorado State †	5	–	9	.357	19	–	14	.576
New Mexico	4	–	10	.286	10	–	18	.357
Air Force	3	–	11	.214	12	–	16	.429
† 2003 Mountain West tournament winner Rankings from AP Poll

2002–03 Northeast Conference men's basketball standings
	Conf.				Overall
Team	W		L	PCT	W		L	PCT
Wagner †	14	–	4	.778	21	–	11	.656
Monmouth	13	–	5	.722	15	–	13	.536
Central Connecticut	12	–	6	.667	15	–	13	.536
Quinnipiac	10	–	8	.556	17	–	12	.586
Saint Francis (PA)	10	–	8	.556	14	–	14	.500
St. Francis (NY)	9	–	9	.500	14	–	16	.467
Fairleigh Dickinson	9	–	9	.500	15	–	14	.517
Long Island	7	–	11	.389	9	–	19	.321
Robert Morris	7	–	11	.389	10	–	17	.370
Mount St. Mary's	6	–	12	.333	11	–	16	.407
Sacred Heart	6	–	12	.333	8	–	21	.276
UMBC	5	–	13	.278	7	–	20	.259
† 2003 NEC tournament winner

2002–03 Ohio Valley Conference men's basketball standings
	Conf.				Overall
Team	W		L	PCT	W		L	PCT
Austin Peay †	13	–	3	.813	23	–	8	.742
Morehead State	13	–	3	.813	20	–	9	.690
Tennessee Tech	11	–	5	.688	20	–	12	.625
Murray State	9	–	7	.563	17	–	12	.586
Eastern Illinois	9	–	7	.563	14	–	15	.483
UT Martin	7	–	9	.438	14	–	14	.500
Southeast Missouri State	5	–	11	.313	11	–	19	.367
Eastern Kentucky	5	–	11	.313	11	–	17	.393
Tennessee State	0	–	16	.000	2	–	25	.074
† 2003 OVC tournament winner Rankings from AP Poll

2002–03 Pacific-10 Conference men's basketball standings
	Conf.				Overall
Team	W		L	PCT	W		L	PCT
No. 5 Arizona	17	–	1	.944	28	–	4	.875
No. 20 Stanford	14	–	4	.778	24	–	9	.727
California	13	–	5	.722	22	–	9	.710
Arizona State	11	–	7	.611	20	–	12	.625
Oregon †	10	–	8	.556	23	–	10	.697
Oregon State	6	–	12	.333	13	–	15	.464
USC	6	–	12	.333	13	–	17	.433
UCLA	6	–	12	.333	10	–	19	.345
Washington	5	–	13	.278	10	–	17	.370
Washington State	2	–	16	.111	7	–	20	.259
† 2003 Pac-10 tournament winner As of July 10, 2011; Rankings from Coaches Poll

2002–03 Patriot League men's basketball standings
	Conf.				Overall
Team	W		L	PCT	W		L	PCT
Holy Cross †	13	–	1	.929	26	–	5	.839
American	9	–	5	.643	16	–	14	.533
Colgate	9	–	5	.643	14	–	14	.500
Lehigh	8	–	6	.571	16	–	12	.571
Bucknell	7	–	7	.500	14	–	15	.483
Lafayette	6	–	8	.429	13	–	16	.448
Navy	4	–	10	.286	8	–	20	.286
Army	0	–	14	.000	5	–	22	.185
† 2003 Patriot League tournament winner

2002–03 Southeastern Conference men's basketball standings
	Conf.				Overall
Team	W		L	PCT	W		L	PCT
East
No. 1 Kentucky †	16	–	0	1.000	32	–	4	.889
No. 10 Florida	12	–	4	.750	25	–	8	.758
No. 25 Georgia	11	–	5	.688	19	–	8	.704
Tennessee	9	–	7	.563	17	–	12	.586
South Carolina	5	–	11	.313	12	–	16	.429
Vanderbilt	3	–	13	.188	11	–	18	.379
West
No. 20 Mississippi State	9	–	7	.563	21	–	10	.677
Auburn	8	–	8	.500	22	–	12	.647
LSU	8	–	8	.500	21	–	11	.656
Alabama	7	–	9	.438	17	–	12	.586
Ole Miss	4	–	12	.250	14	–	15	.483
Arkansas	4	–	12	.250	9	–	19	.321
† 2003 SEC tournament winner Rankings from AP Poll

2002–03 Southern Conference men's basketball standings
	Conf.				Overall
Team	W		L	PCT	W		L	PCT
North
Davidson	11	–	5	.688	17	–	10	.630
East Tennessee State †	11	–	5	.688	20	–	11	.645
Appalachian State	11	–	5	.688	19	–	10	.655
Western Carolina	6	–	10	.375	9	–	19	.321
VMI	3	–	13	.188	10	–	20	.333
UNC Greensboro	3	–	13	.188	7	–	22	.241
South
College of Charleston	13	–	3	.813	25	–	8	.758
Chattanooga	11	–	5	.688	21	–	9	.700
Georgia Southern	8	–	8	.500	16	–	13	.552
Wofford	8	–	8	.500	14	–	15	.483
Furman	8	–	8	.500	14	–	17	.452
The Citadel	3	–	13	.188	8	–	20	.286
† SoCon Tournament winner As of April 30, 2003; Rankings from AP poll

2002–03 Southland Conference men's basketball standings
	Conf.				Overall
Team	W		L	PCT	W		L	PCT
Sam Houston State †	17	–	3	.850	23	–	7	.767
Stephen F. Austin	16	–	4	.800	21	–	8	.724
Texas–Arlington	13	–	7	.650	16	–	13	.552
Southwest Texas State	11	–	9	.550	17	–	12	.586
McNeese State	10	–	10	.500	15	–	14	.517
Lamar	10	–	10	.500	13	–	14	.481
Louisiana-Monroe	10	–	10	.500	12	–	16	.429
Southeastern Louisiana	9	–	11	.450	11	–	16	.407
UTSA	7	–	13	.350	10	–	17	.370
Northwestern State	6	–	14	.300	6	–	21	.222
Nicholls State	1	–	19	.050	3	–	25	.107
† 2003 Southland tournament winner Rankings from AP poll

2002–03 SWAC men's basketball standings
	Conf.				Overall
Team	W		L	PCT	W		L	PCT
Prairie View A&M	14	–	4	.778	17	–	12	.586
Mississippi Valley State	13	–	5	.722	15	–	14	.517
Texas Southern †	11	–	7	.611	18	–	13	.581
Alabama State	11	–	7	.611	14	–	15	.483
Alcorn State	10	–	8	.556	14	–	19	.424
Grambling	9	–	9	.500	12	–	18	.400
Jackson State	9	–	9	.500	10	–	18	.357
Southern	5	–	13	.278	9	–	20	.310
Alabama A&M	4	–	14	.222	8	–	19	.296
Arkansas–Pine Bluff	4	–	14	.222	4	–	24	.143
† 2003 SWAC tournament winner Rankings from AP Poll

2002–03 Sun Belt Conference men's basketball standings
	Conf.				Overall
Team	W		L	PCT	W		L	PCT
East
Western Kentucky †	12	–	2	.857	24	–	9	.727
Middle Tennessee	9	–	5	.643	16	–	14	.533
Arkansas-Little Rock	8	–	6	.571	18	–	12	.600
Arkansas State	6	–	8	.429	13	–	15	.464
Florida International	1	–	13	.071	8	–	21	.276
West
Louisiana–Lafayette	12	–	3	.800	20	–	10	.667
New Mexico State	9	–	6	.600	20	–	9	.690
South Alabama	7	–	8	.467	14	–	14	.500
New Orleans	7	–	8	.467	15	–	14	.517
Denver	7	–	8	.467	17	–	15	.531
North Texas	2	–	13	.133	7	–	21	.250
† 2003 Sun Belt Conference tournament winner Rankings from AP poll

2002–03 West Coast Conference men's basketball standings
	Conf.				Overall
Team	W		L	PCT	W		L	PCT
Gonzaga	12	–	2	.857	24	–	9	.727
San Diego †	10	–	4	.714	18	–	12	.600
San Francisco	9	–	5	.643	15	–	14	.517
Pepperdine	7	–	7	.500	15	–	13	.536
Saint Mary's	6	–	8	.429	15	–	15	.500
Portland	4	–	10	.286	11	–	17	.393
Loyola Marymount	4	–	10	.286	11	–	20	.355
Santa Clara	4	–	10	.286	13	–	15	.464
† 2003 WCC tournament winner Rankings from AP Poll

2002–03 WAC men's basketball standings
	Conf.				Overall
Team	W		L	PCT	W		L	PCT
Fresno State	13	–	5	.722	20	–	8	.714
Tulsa †	12	–	6	.667	23	–	10	.697
SMU	11	–	7	.611	17	–	13	.567
Nevada	11	–	7	.611	18	–	14	.563
Rice	11	–	7	.611	19	–	10	.655
Hawaii	9	–	9	.500	19	–	12	.613
Louisiana Tech	9	–	9	.500	12	–	15	.444
Boise State	7	–	11	.389	13	–	16	.448
San Jose State	4	–	14	.222	7	–	21	.250
UTEP	3	–	15	.167	6	–	24	.200
† 2003 WAC tournament winner

=== Division I independents ===
Eight schools played as Division I independents.

2002–03 NCAA Division I men's basketball independents standings
	Conf.				Overall
Team	W		L	PCT	W		L	PCT
Birmingham–Southern	-	–	-	–	19	–	9	.679
Centenary	-	–	-	–	14	–	14	.500
Texas A&M–Corpus Christi	-	–	-	–	14	–	15	.483
Texas–Pan American	-	–	-	–	10	–	20	.333
IPFW	-	–	-	–	9	–	21	.300
Lipscomb	-	–	-	–	8	–	20	.286
Morris Brown	-	–	-	–	8	–	20	.286
Savannah State	-	–	-	–	3	–	24	.111
Rankings from AP Poll

=== Informal championships ===
Conference	Regular season winner	Most Valuable Player
Philadelphia Big 5	Saint Joseph's	Jameer Nelson, Saint Joseph's

Saint Joseph's finished with a 4–0 record in head-to-head competition among the Philadelphia Big 5.

=== Statistical leaders ===
Source for additional stats categories

Points per game			Rebounds per game			Assists per game			Steals per game		
Player	School	PPG	Player	School	RPG	Player	School	APG	Player	School	SPG
Ruben Douglas	New Mexico	28.0	Brandon Hunter	Ohio	12.6	Martell Bailey	Illinois-Chicago	8.1	Alexis McMillan	Stetson	4.0
Henry Domercant	E. Illinois	27.9	Amien Hicks	Morris Brown	12.4	Marques Green	St. Bonaventure	8.0	Zakee Wadood	E. Tennessee St.	3.2
Mike Helms	Oakland	26.9	Adam Sonn	Belmont	12.1	T. J. Ford	Texas	7.7	Jay Heard	Jacksonville St.	3.2
Michael Watson	UMKC	25.5	Chris Kaman	C. Michigan	12.0	Elliott Prasse-Freeman	Harvard	7.7	Eric Bush	UAB	3.1
Troy Bell	Boston College	25.2	David West	Xavier	11.8	Antawn Dobie	LIU	7.4	Marcus Hatten	St. John's	2.9

Blocked shots per game			Field goal percentage			Three-point FG percentage			Free throw percentage		
Player	School	BPG	Player	School	FG%	Player	School	3FG%	Player	School	FT%
Emeka Okafor	UConn	4.7	Adam Mark	Belmont	67.0	Jeff Schiffner	Penn	49.3	Steve Drabyn	Belmont	95.1
Nick Billings	Binghamton	4.3	Rickey White	Maine	66.2	Kyle Korver	Creighton	48.0	Matt Logie	Lehigh	94.8
Justin Rowe	Maine	4.2	Matt Nelson	Colorado St.	64.3	Terrence Woods	Florida A&M	45.7	Hollis Price	Oklahoma	92.9
Deng Gai	Fairfield	3.8	Armond Williams	Illinois-Chicago	63.9	Chez Marks	Morehead St.	45.6	Brian Dux	Canisius	92.0
Robert Battle	Drexel	3.7	Michael Harris	Rice	62.3	Tyson Dorsey	Samford	45.5	JJ Redick	Duke	91.9

== Postseason tournaments ==
=== NCAA tournament ===
==== Final Four – Louisiana Superdome, New Orleans, Louisiana ====
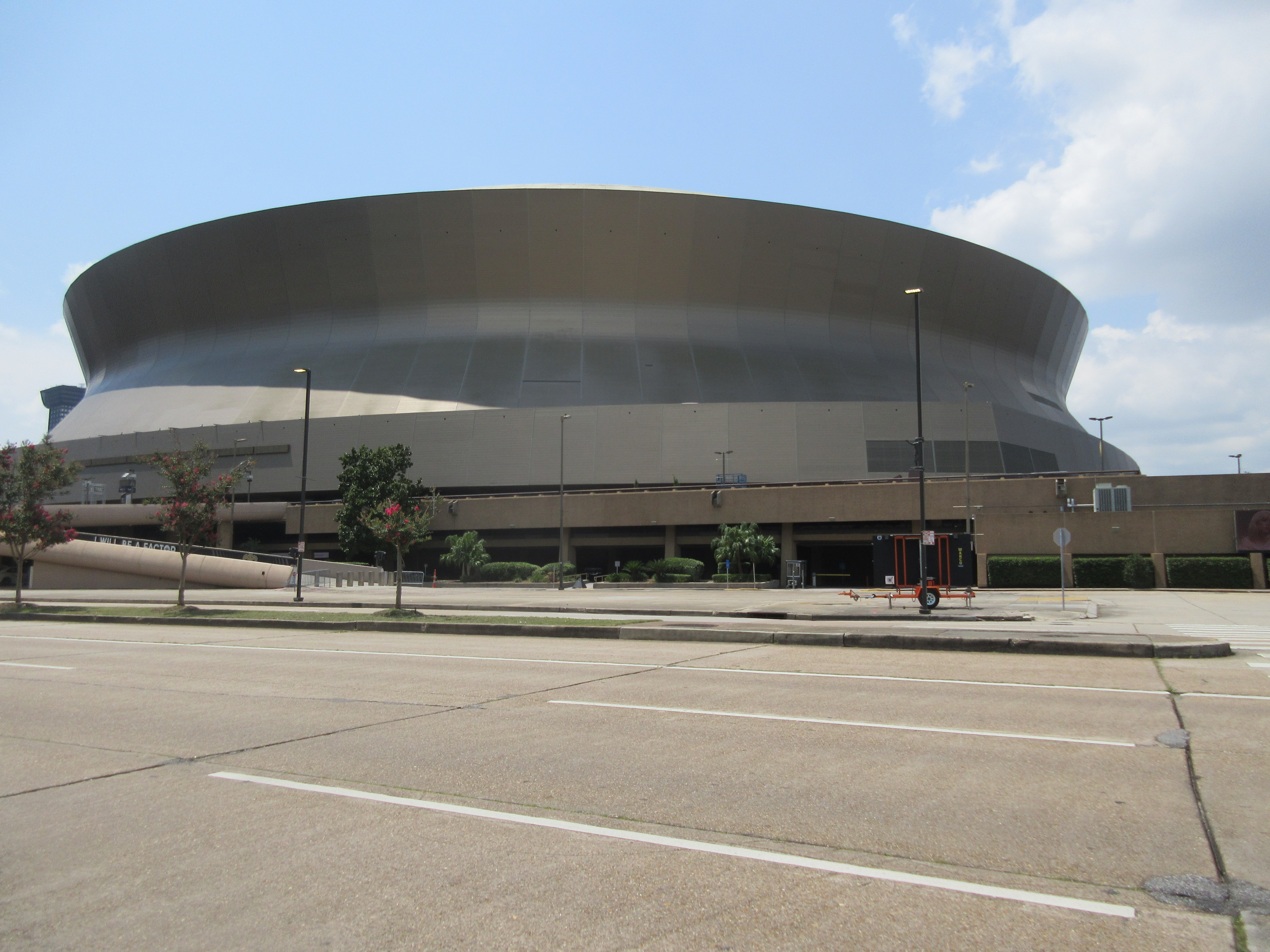
The Louisiana Superdome in New Orleans, Louisiana, hosted the NCAA men's Final Four.

National semifinals
E3	Syracuse	95
S1	Texas	84
M3	Marquette	61
W2	Kansas	94

National championship game
E3	Syracuse	81
W2	Kansas	78

=== Semifinals & finals ===
Semifinals
Georgetown	88
Minnesota	74
Texas Tech	63
St. John's	64

Finals
Georgetown	67
St. John's	70
Third place
Minnesota	61
Texas Tech	71

== Award winners ==
=== Consensus All-American teams ===
Consensus First Team
Player	Position	Class	Team
David West	F	Senior	Xavier
T. J. Ford	G	Sophomore	Texas
Josh Howard	F/G	Senior	Wake Forest
Nick Collison	F	Senior	Kansas
Dwyane Wade	G	Junior	Marquette

Consensus Second Team
Player	Position	Class	Team
Hollis Price	G	Senior	Oklahoma
Carmelo Anthony	F/G	Freshman	Syracuse
Kyle Korver	F	Senior	Creighton
Troy Bell	G	Senior	Boston College
Jason Gardner	G	Senior	Arizona

=== Major player of the year awards ===
- Wooden Award: T. J. Ford, Texas
- Naismith Award: T. J. Ford, Texas
- Associated Press Player of the Year: David West, Xavier
- NABC Player of the Year: Nick Collison, Kansas
- Oscar Robertson Trophy (USBWA): David West, Xavier
- Adolph Rupp Trophy: David West, Xavier
- Sporting News Player of the Year: T. J. Ford, Texas

=== Major freshman of the year awards ===
- USBWA Freshman of the Year: Carmelo Anthony, Syracuse
- Sporting News Freshman of the Year: Carmelo Anthony, Syracuse

=== Major coach of the year awards ===
- Associated Press Coach of the Year: Tubby Smith, Kentucky
- Henry Iba Award (USBWA): Tubby Smith, Kentucky
- NABC Coach of the Year: Tubby Smith, Kentucky
- Naismith College Coach of the Year: Tubby Smith, Kentucky
- CBS/Chevrolet Coach of the Year: Tubby Smith, Kentucky
- Sporting News Coach of the Year: Tubby Smith, Kentucky

=== Other major awards ===
- Pete Newell Big Man Award (Best big man): David West, Xavier
- NABC Defensive Player of the Year: Emeka Okafor, Connecticut
- Frances Pomeroy Naismith Award (Best player under 6'0): Jason Gardner, Arizona
- Lowe's Senior CLASS Award (top senior): David West, Xavier
- Robert V. Geasey Trophy (Top player in Philadelphia Big 5): Jameer Nelson, St. Joseph's
- NIT/Haggerty Award (Top player in New York City metro area): Luis Flores, Manhattan
- Chip Hilton Player of the Year Award (Strong personal character): Brandon Miller, Butler

== Coaching changes ==
A number of teams changed coaches throughout the season and after the season ended.

Team	Former Coach	Interim Coach	New Coach	Reason
Alcorn State	Davey Whitney		Samuel West	
Arkansas-Little Rock	Porter Moser		Steve Shields	
Cal State Fullerton	Donny Daniels		Bob Burton	
Campbell	Billy Lee		Robbie Laing	
Chicago State	Bo Ellis		Kevin Jones	
Clemson	Larry Shyatt		Oliver Purnell	
Cleveland State	Rollie Massimino		Mike Garland	
Columbia	Armond Hill		Joe Jones	
Dayton	Oliver Purnell		Brian Gregory	
Drake	Kurt Kanaskie		Tom Davis	
East Tennessee State	Ed DeChellis		Murry Bartow	
Elon	Mark Simons		Ernie Nestor	
Fordham	Bob Hill		Dereck Whittenburg	
Georgia	Jim Harrick		Dennis Felton	
Georgia State	Lefty Driesell		Michael Perry	
High Point	Jerry Steele		Bart Lundy	
Illinois	Bill Self		Bruce Weber	
Illinois State	Tom Richardson		Porter Moser	
Iowa State	Larry Eustachy		Wayne Morgan	Eustachy quit following the release of pictures of him at a party near the campus of the University of Missouri.
Jackson State	Andy Stoglin		Tevester Anderson	
Kansas	Roy Williams		Bill Self	After turning down the North Carolina job previously, Williams accepted the position at his alma mater.
Marshall	Greg White		Ron Jirsa	
Mount St. Mary's	Jim Phelan		Milan Brown	Phelan retired after 49 years and 830 victories.
Murray State	Tevester Anderson		Mick Cronin	
North Carolina	Matt Doherty		Roy Williams	Doherty resigned after rumors of player unrest. UNC alum Williams is hired away from Kansas.
North Carolina A&T	Curtis Hunter		Jerry Eaves	
Penn State	Jerry Dunn		Ed DeChellis	
Pittsburgh	Ben Howland		Jamie Dixon	
St. Bonaventure	Jan van Breda Kolff		Anthony Solomon	
South Carolina State	Cy Alexander		Ben Betts	
South Florida	Seth Greenberg		Robert McCullum	
Southern	Ben Jobe		Michael Grant	
Southern Illinois	Bruce Weber		Matt Painter	
Tennessee State	Nolan Richardson III	Hosea Lewis	Cy Alexander	Richardson III was suspended and ultimately resigned after allegedly threatening an assistant coach with a gun.
UCLA	Steve Lavin		Ben Howland	Lavin was fired following a 10–19 season.
Virginia Tech	Ricky Stokes		Seth Greenberg	
Wagner	Dereck Whittenburg		Mike Deane	
Washington State	Paul Graham		Dick Bennett	
Western Illinois	Jim Kerwin		Derek Thomas	
Western Kentucky	Dennis Felton		Darrin Horn	
Western Michigan	Robert McCullum		Steve Hawkins	
William & Mary	Rick Boyages		Tony Shaver	
Wright State	Ed Schilling		Paul Biancardi	
