= 2002–03 Arizona Wildcats men's basketball team =

American college basketball season

2002–03 Arizona Wildcats men's basketball

Pac-10 Regular-Season Champions

NCAA tournament, Elite Eight
- Conference: Pacific-10 Conference

Ranking
- Coaches: No. 5
- AP: No. 2
- Record: 28–4 (17–1 Pac-10)
- Head coach: Lute Olson (20th season)
- Assistant coaches: Jim Rosborough; Rodney Tention; Josh Pastner
- Home arena: McKale Center

2002–03 Pacific-10 Conference men's basketball standings
| | Conf. | | | | Overall |
| Team | W | | L | PCT | W | | L | PCT |
|---|---|---|---|---|---|---|---|---|
| No. 5 Arizona | 17 | – | 1 | .944 | 28 | – | 4 | .875 |
| No. 20 Stanford | 14 | – | 4 | .778 | 24 | – | 9 | .727 |
| California | 13 | – | 5 | .722 | 22 | – | 9 | .710 |
| Arizona State | 11 | – | 7 | .611 | 20 | – | 12 | .625 |
| Oregon † | 10 | – | 8 | .556 | 23 | – | 10 | .697 |
| Oregon State | 6 | – | 12 | .333 | 13 | – | 15 | .464 |
| USC | 6 | – | 12 | .333 | 13 | – | 17 | .433 |
| UCLA | 6 | – | 12 | .333 | 10 | – | 19 | .345 |
| Washington | 5 | – | 13 | .278 | 10 | – | 17 | .370 |
| Washington State | 2 | – | 16 | .111 | 7 | – | 20 | .259 |
† 2003 Pac-10 tournament winner As of July 10, 2011; Rankings from Coaches Poll

The 2002–03 Arizona Wildcats men's basketball team represented the University of Arizona during the 2002–03 NCAA Division I men's basketball season. Head coach Lute Olson led the team in his 20th season at Arizona. The team played their home games at McKale Center in Tucson, Arizona as members of the Pacific-10 Conference.

The team earned the program's 10th Pacific-10 Conference championship with a record of 17–1 in conference play and 28–4 overall.

== Roster ==
2002–03 Arizona Wildcats men's basketball team
Players
Coaches

| Pos. | # | Name | Height | Weight | Year | Hometown |
|---|---|---|---|---|---|---|
| C | 2 | Isaiah Fox | 6 ft 9 in (2.06 m) | 265 lb (120 kg) | So | Santa Monica, California |
| G | 3 | Will Bynum | 5 ft 10 in (1.78 m) | 183 lb (83 kg) | So | Chicago, Illinois |
| F | 4 | Luke Walton | 6 ft 8 in (2.03 m) | 241 lb (109 kg) | Sr | San Diego, California |
| G | 11 | Jason Ranne | 6 ft 4 in (1.93 m) | 204 lb (93 kg) | Jr | Tulsa, Oklahoma |
| G | 12 | Fil Torres (W) | 6 ft 2 in (1.88 m) | 185 lb (84 kg) | Sr | Lisle, Illinois |
| G | 13 | Chris Rogers | 6 ft 3 in (1.91 m) | 195 lb (88 kg) | Fr | Portland, Oregon |
| G | 20 | Salim Stoudamire | 6 ft 1 in (1.85 m) | 176 lb (80 kg) | So | Portland, Oregon |
| G | 21 | Hassan Adams | 6 ft 4 in (1.93 m) | 195 lb (88 kg) | Fr | Los Angeles, California |
| G | 22 | Jason Gardner | 5 ft 10 in (1.78 m) | 181 lb (82 kg) | Sr | Indianapolis, Indiana |
| F | 24 | Andre Iguodala | 6 ft 6 in (1.98 m) | 210 lb (95 kg) | Fr | Springfield, Illinois |
| F | 33 | Rick Anderson | 6 ft 9 in (2.06 m) | 213 lb (97 kg) | Sr | Long Beach, California |
| F | 34 | Dennis Latimore | 6 ft 8 in (2.03 m) | 254 lb (115 kg) | So | Halstead, Kansas |
| F | 44 | Chris Dunn | 6 ft 6 in (1.98 m) | 170 lb (77 kg) | Fr | Hobbs, New Mexico |
| C | 45 | Channing Frye | 6 ft 10 in (2.08 m) | 222 lb (101 kg) | So | Phoenix, Arizona |

Head coach

- Lute Olsen

Assistant coach(es)

- Jim Rosborough
- Rodney Tention
- Josh Pastner

Legend

- (C) Team captain
- (S) Suspended
- (I) Ineligible
- (W) Walk-on
- Injured
- Current redshirt

Roster

== Schedule and results ==
| Date time, TV | Rank^{#} | Opponent^{#} | Result | Record | High points | High rebounds | High assists | Site (attendance) city, state |
Non-conference regular season
| Nov. 23, 2002*; 2:00 p.m., Fox Sports Net Arizona | No. 1 | No. 19 Western Kentucky | W 107–68 | 1–0 | 22 – H. Adams | 9 – C. Frye | 7 – L. Walton | McKale Center (14,584); Tucson, Arizona |
| Nov. 27, 2002*; 6:30 p.m., FSNA | No. 1 | Northern Arizona | W 101–66 | 2–0 | 22 – J. Gardner | 6 – Tied | 5 – J. Gardner | McKale Center (14,514); Tucson, Arizona |
| Dec. 3, 2002*; FSNA | No. 1 | Saint Louis | W 91–58 | 3–0 | 16 – J. Gardner | 10 – A. Iguodala | 7 – L. Walton | McKale Center (14,501); Tucson, Arizona |
| Dec. 7, 2002*; 7:00 p.m., ESPN | No. 1 | at San Diego State | W 89–81 | 4–0 | 16 – J. Gardner | 10 – A. Iguodala | 7 – L. Walton | Cox Arena (12,414); San Diego, California |
| Dec. 15, 2002*; 2:30 p.m., Fox Sports Net | No. 1 | No. 8 Texas | W 73–70 | 5–0 | 14 – S. Stoudamire | 8 – Tied | 7 – J. Gardner | McKale Center (14,577); Tucson, Arizona |
| Dec. 21, 2002*; 7:00 p.m., ESPN2 | No. 1 | at LSU | L 65–66 | 5–1 | 16 – J. Gardner | 11 – A. Iguodala | 2 – R. Anderson | Pete Maravich Assembly Center (9,735); Baton Rouge, Louisiana |
| Dec. 28, 2002*; 4:00 p.m., FSNA | No. 4 | Davidson; Fiesta Bowl Classic | W 95–69 | 6–1 | 23 – S. Stoudamire | 9 – C. Frye | 7 – J. Gardner | McKale Center (14,585); Tucson, Arizona |
| Dec. 30, 2002*; 7:00 p.m., FSNA | No. 4 | Boston University | W 85–71 | 7–1 | 17 – H. Adams | 7 – Tied | 6 – J. Gardner | McKale Center (14,587); Tucson, Arizona |
2002–03 Pacific-10 Conference Regular Season
| Jan. 2, 2003; 9:00 p.m., FSN | No. 4 | at No. 9 Oregon | W 81–72 | 8–1 (1–0) | 21 – J. Gardner | 9 – H. Adams | 5 – A. Iguodala | McArthur Court (9,087); Eugene, Oregon |
| Jan. 4, 2003; 8:00 p.m., FSNA | No. 4 | at Oregon State | W 80–65 | 9–1 (2–0) | 14 – H. Adams | 10 – I. Fox | 7 – J. Gardner | Gill Coliseum (8,415); Corvallis, Oregon |
| Jan. 9, 2003; 8:30 p.m., FSN | No. 2 | Washington State | W 82–69 | 10–1 (3–0) | 19 – J. Gardner | 14 – C. Frye | 8 – L. Walton | McKale Center (14,462); Tucson, Arizona |
| Jan. 11, 2003; 5:00 p.m., FSNA | No. 2 | Washington | W 79–61 | 11–1 (4–0) | 23 – S. Stoudamire | 7 – C. Frye | 9 – J. Gardner | McKale Center (14,570); Tucson, Arizona |
| Jan. 16, 2003; 7:30 p.m., FSN | No. 2 | at USC | W 81–72 | 12–1 (5–0) | 21 – H. Adams | 10 – Tied | 8 – L. Walton | L.A. Sports Arena (9,951); Los Angeles, California |
| Jan. 18, 2003; 3:00 p.m., ABC | No. 2 | UCLA; Rivalry | W 87–52 | 13–1 (6–0) | 19 – S. Stoudamire | 9 – A. Iguodala | 5 – L. Walton | Pauley Pavilion (11,082); Los Angeles, California |
| Jan. 22, 2003; 7:30 p.m., FSNA | No. 1 | Arizona State; Rivalry | W 71–63 | 14–1 (7–0) | 19 – J. Gardner | 7 – Tied | 7 – A. Iguodala | McKale Center (14,567); Tucson, Arizona |
| Jan. 25, 2003*; 12:00 p.m., CBS | No. 1 | at No. 6 Kansas | W 91–74 | 15–1 | 32 – S. Stoudamire | 8 – C. Frye | 7 – L. Walton | Allen Fieldhouse (16,300); Lawrence, Kansas |
| Jan. 30, 2003; 6:30 p.m., FSN | No. 1 | Stanford | L 77–82 | 15–2 (7–1) | 22 – J. Gardner | 9 – L. Walton | 6 – J. Gardner | McKale Center (14,579); Tucson, Arizona |
| Feb. 1, 2003; 5:00 p.m., FSN | No. 1 | No. 20 California | W 95–80 | 16–2 (8–1) | 18 – J. Gardner | 12 – C. Frye | 7 – J. Gardner | McKale Center (14,582); Tucson, Arizona |
| Feb. 6, 2003; 7:30, FSN | No. 2 | at Washington | W 88–85 ^{OT} | 17–2 (9–1) | 25 – S. Stoudamire | 12 – C. Frye | 7 – J. Gardner | Bank of America Arena (10,028); Seattle, Washington |
| Feb. 8, 2003; 7:00 p.m., FSNA | No. 2 | at Washington State | W 75–62 | 18–2 (10–1) | 19 – J. Gardner | 7 – Tied | 3 – J. Gardner | Beasley Coliseum (4,419); Pullman, Washington |
| Feb. 13, 2003; 8:30 p.m., FSN | No. 1 | No. 19 UCLA; Rivalry | W 106–70 | 19–2 (11–1) | 18 – A. Iguodala | 6 – Tied | 4 – L. Walton | McKale Center (14,559); Tucson, Arizona |
| Feb. 15, 2003; 11:00 a.m., CBS | No. 1 | USC | W 86–51 | 20–2 (12–1) | 25 – C. Frye | 14 – C. Frye | 7 – L. Walton | McKale Center (14,584); Tucson, Arizona |
| Feb. 22, 2003; 7:00 p.m., FSNA | No. 1 | at Arizona State; Rivalry | W 92–72 | 21–2 (13–1) | 23 – Tied | 12 – R. Anderson | 10 – J. Gardner | Wells Fargo Center (14,421); Tempe, Arizona |
| Feb. 27, 2003; 7:30 p.m., FSN | No. 1 | at No. 23 California | W 88–75 | 22–2 (14–1) | 20 – Tied | 7 – J. Gardner | 4 – Tied | Haas Pavilion (11,877); Berkeley, California |
| Mar. 1, 2003; 4:00 p.m., ABC | No. 1 | at No. 19 Stanford | W 72–69 | 23–2 (15–1) | 18 – S. Stoudamire | 11 – L. Walton | 4 – Tied | Maples Pavilion (7,391); Stanford, California |
| Mar. 6, 2003; 6:30 p.m., FSNA | No. 1 | Oregon State | W 72–60 | 24–2 (16–1) | 24 – C. Frye | 12 – C. Frye | 7 – L. Walton | McKale Center (14,587); Tucson, Arizona |
| Mar. 8, 2003; 2:00 p.m., CBS | No. 1 | Oregon | W 88–80 | 25–2 (17–1) | 27 – J. Gardner | 8 – Tied | 6 – L. Walton | McKale Center (14,589); Tucson, Arizona |
Pacific-10 tournament
| Mar. 13, 2003*; 1:20 p.m., FSN | (1) No. 1 | vs. (8) UCLA; Quarterfinals | L 89–96 ^{OT} | 25–3 | 23 – Tied | 11 – R. Anderson | 7 – L. Walton | Staples Center (15,048); Los Angeles, California |
NCAA tournament
| Mar. 20, 2003*; 1:20 p.m., CBS | (1 W) No. 2 | vs. (16 W) Vermont; First Round | W 80-51 | 26–3 | 18 – S. Stoudamire | 12 – C. Frye | 6 – Tied | Jon M. Huntsman Center (14,378); Salt Lake City, Utah |
| Mar. 22, 2003*; 2:40 p.m., CBS | (1 W) No. 2 | vs. (9 W) Gonzaga; Second Round | W 96–95 ^{2OT} | 27–3 | 22 – Tied | 12 – C. Frye | 9 – L. WAlton | Jon M. Hunstman Center (14,627); Salt Lake City, Utah |
| Mar. 27, 2003*; 4:20 p.m., CBS | (1 W) No. 2 | vs. (5 W) No. 22 Notre Dame; Sweet Sixteen | W 88–71 | 28–3 | 19 – J. Gardner | 12 – Tied | 8 – L. Walton | Arrowhead Pond of Anaheim (17,607); Anaheim, California |
| Mar. 29, 2003*; 4:00 p.m., CBS | (1 W) No. 2 | vs. (2 W) No. 6 Kansas; Elite Eight | L 75–78 | 28–4 | 23 – J. Gardner | 10 – L. Walton | 6 – L. Walton | Arrowhead Pond of Anaheim (17,439); Anaheim, California |
*Non-conference game. ^{#}Rankings from AP Poll. (#) Tournament seedings in parentheses. All times are in Mountain Time.

=== NCAA Division I tournament ===
- West
  - Arizona (#1 seed) 80, Vermont 51
  - Arizona 96, Gonzaga 95 (2OT)
  - Arizona 88, Notre Dame 71
  - Kansas 78, Arizona 75

== 2003 NCAA Tournament ==
Arizona was invited to the NCAA tournament for the 19th-straight season, receiving the top seed in the West Region. The team advanced to the Elite Eight by defeating (16-seed) Vermont, (9) Gonzaga, and (5) Notre Dame before falling 78-75 to (2) Kansas.

== Awards ==
Jason Gardner

- Consensus NCAA All-America Second Team
- Pac-10 All-Conference Team

Luke Walton

- Pac-10 All-Conference Team

Hassan Adams

- Pac-10 All-Freshman Team

Andre Iguodala

- Pac-10 All-Freshman Team

Lute Olson

- Pac-10 Coach of the Year
- Induction into the Naismith Memorial Basketball Hall of Fame (September 27, 2002)
