= 2002–03 Washington Huskies men's basketball team =

American college basketball season

2002–03 Washington Huskies men's basketball
- Conference: Pacific-10 Conference
- Record: 10–17 (5–13 Pac-10)
- Head coach: Lorenzo Romar (1st season)
- Assistant coaches: Cameron Dollar; Ken Bone; Russ Schoene
- Home arena: Hec Edmundson Pavilion

2002–03 Pacific-10 Conference men's basketball standings
| | Conf. | | | | Overall |
| Team | W | | L | PCT | W | | L | PCT |
|---|---|---|---|---|---|---|---|---|
| No. 5 Arizona | 17 | – | 1 | .944 | 28 | – | 4 | .875 |
| No. 20 Stanford | 14 | – | 4 | .778 | 24 | – | 9 | .727 |
| California | 13 | – | 5 | .722 | 22 | – | 9 | .710 |
| Arizona State | 11 | – | 7 | .611 | 20 | – | 12 | .625 |
| Oregon † | 10 | – | 8 | .556 | 23 | – | 10 | .697 |
| Oregon State | 6 | – | 12 | .333 | 13 | – | 15 | .464 |
| USC | 6 | – | 12 | .333 | 13 | – | 17 | .433 |
| UCLA | 6 | – | 12 | .333 | 10 | – | 19 | .345 |
| Washington | 5 | – | 13 | .278 | 10 | – | 17 | .370 |
| Washington State | 2 | – | 16 | .111 | 7 | – | 20 | .259 |
† 2003 Pac-10 tournament winner As of July 10, 2011; Rankings from Coaches Poll

The 2002–03 Washington Huskies men's basketball team represented the University of Washington for the 2002–03 NCAA Division I men's basketball season. Led by first-year head coach Lorenzo Romar, the Huskies were members of the Pacific-10 Conference and played their home games on campus at Hec Edmundson Pavilion in Seattle, Washington.

The Huskies were 10–17 overall in the regular season and 5–13 in conference play, ninth in the standings. They did not qualify for the eight-team conference tournament; a road loss in the season finale to struggling UCLA dropped Washington to ninth. The year's notable victory was over Stanford in mid-January, the first win over the Cardinal in six years.

Alumnus Romar was hired in April 2002; previously the head coach at Saint Louis, he led the Husky program for fifteen years.
