= 2002–03 Arizona State Sun Devils men's basketball team =

American college basketball season

2002–03 Arizona State Sun Devils men's basketball

NCAA tournament, second round
- Conference: Pacific-10 Conference
- Record: 20–12 (11–7 Pac-10)
- Head coach: Rob Evans
- Home arena: Wells Fargo Arena

2002–03 Pacific-10 Conference men's basketball standings
	Conf.				Overall
Team	W		L	PCT	W		L	PCT
No. 5 Arizona	17	–	1	.944	28	–	4	.875
No. 20 Stanford	14	–	4	.778	24	–	9	.727
California	13	–	5	.722	22	–	9	.710
Arizona State	11	–	7	.611	20	–	12	.625
Oregon †	10	–	8	.556	23	–	10	.697
Oregon State	6	–	12	.333	13	–	15	.464
USC	6	–	12	.333	13	–	17	.433
UCLA	6	–	12	.333	10	–	19	.345
Washington	5	–	13	.278	10	–	17	.370
Washington State	2	–	16	.111	7	–	20	.259
† 2003 Pac-10 tournament winner As of July 10, 2011; Rankings from Coaches Poll

The 2002–03 Arizona State Sun Devils men's basketball team represented Arizona State University during the 2002–03 NCAA Division I men's basketball season. The Sun Devils played their home games at the Wells Fargo Arena and are members of the Pacific-10 Conference. The Sun Devils finished with 20–12, 11–7 in Pac-10 play and lost in the quarterfinal round of the 2003 Pacific-10 Conference men's basketball tournament. They earned a trip to the 2003 NCAA Division I men's basketball tournament, where they defeated Memphis before losing eventual National runner-up to Kansas in the second round.

== Roster ==
2002–03 Arizona State Sun Devils men's basketball team
Players	Coaches
Pos. / # / Name / Height / Weight / Year / Hometown; F / 5 / Ike Diogu / 6 ft 8 in (2.03 m) / 250 lb (113 kg) / Fr	Head coach: Rob Evans; Assistant coach(es) Legend: (C) Team captain; (S) Suspended; (I) Ineligible; (W) Walk-on; Injured; Current redshirt

== Schedule ==
Date time, TV	Rank^{#}	Opponent^{#}	Result	Record	Site (attendance) city, state
Non-conference regular season
Nov 22, 2002*		Morehead State	W 59–56	1–0	Wells Fargo Arena; Tempe, Arizona
Nov 25, 2002*		vs. No. 15 Kentucky; Maui Invitational Tournament	L 65–82	1–1	Lahaina Civic Center; Lahaina, Hawaii
Nov 26, 2002*		vs. Chaminade; Maui Invitational Tournament	W 101–72	2–1	Lahaina Civic Center; Lahaina, Hawaii
Nov 27, 2002*		vs. Utah; Maui Invitational Tournament	W 83–79 ^{OT}	3–1	Lahaina Civic Center; Lahaina, Hawaii
Nov 30, 2002*		Lafayette	W 85–62	4–1	Wells Fargo Arena; Tempe, Arizona
Dec 4, 2002*		BYU	L 60–64	4–2	Wells Fargo Arena; Tempe, Arizona
Dec 7, 2002*		at Utah	L 55–78	4–3	Jon M. Huntsman Center; Salt Lake City, Utah
Dec 10, 2002*		Nevada	W 76–63	5–3	Wells Fargo Arena; Tempe, Arizona
Dec 21, 2002*; 8:00 p.m.		vs. Purdue; Las Vegas Showdown	W 70–53	6–3	Thomas & Mack Center; Las Vegas, Nevada
Dec 27, 2002*		Bucknell	W 79–52	7–3	Wells Fargo Arena; Tempe, Arizona
Dec 28, 2002*		Nebraska	W 75–63	8–3	Wells Fargo Arena; Tempe, Arizona
Pac-10 regular season
Jan 2, 2003		at Oregon State	W 67–47	9–3 (1–0)	Gill Coliseum; Corvallis, Oregon
Jan 4, 2003		at No. 9 Oregon	L 73–94	9–4 (1–1)	McArthur Court; Eugene, Oregon
Jan 9, 2003		Washington	W 89–57	10–4 (2–1)	Wells Fargo Arena; Tempe, Arizona
Jan 11, 2003		Washington State	W 96–55	11–4 (3–1)	Wells Fargo Arena; Tempe, Arizona
Jan 16, 2003		at UCLA	W 75–64	12–4 (4–1)	Pauley Pavilion; Los Angeles, California
Jan 18, 2003		at USC	L 74–76	12–5 (4–2)	L.A. Sports Arena; Los Angeles, California
Jan 22, 2003		at No. 1 Arizona	L 63–71	12–6 (4–3)	McKale Center; Tucson, Arizona
Jan 30, 2003		No. 20 California	W 75–70	13–6 (5–3)	Wells Fargo Arena; Tempe, Arizona
Feb 1, 2003		Stanford	L 57–58	13–7 (5–4)	Wells Fargo Arena; Tempe, Arizona
Feb 6, 2003		at Washington State	W 87–54	14–7 (6–4)	Beasley Coliseum; Pullman, Washington
Feb 8, 2003		at Washington	W 79–77 ^{OT}	15–7 (7–4)	Bank of America Arena; Seattle, Washington
Feb 13, 2003		USC	W 108–78	16–7 (8–4)	Wells Fargo Arena; Tempe, Arizona
Feb 15, 2003		UCLA	W 85–69	17–7 (9–4)	Wells Fargo Arena; Tempe, Arizona
Feb 22, 2003		No. 1 Arizona	L 72–92	17–8 (9–5)	Wells Fargo Arena; Tempe, Arizona
Feb 27, 2003		at No. 19 Stanford	L 77–88	17–9 (9–6)	Maples Pavilion; Stanford, California
Mar 2, 2003		at No. 23 California	L 72–80	17–10 (9–7)	Haas Pavilion; Berkeley, California
Mar 6, 2003		Oregon	W 91–77	18–10 (10–7)	Wells Fargo Arena; Tempe, Arizona
Mar 8, 2003		Oregon State	W 74–64	19–10 (11–7)	Wells Fargo Arena; Tempe, Arizona
Pac-10 tournament
Mar 13, 2003*		vs. Oregon; Quarterfinals	L 82–83	19–11	Staples Center; Los Angeles, California
NCAA tournament
Mar 20, 2003*	(10 W)	vs. (7 W) No. 19 Memphis; First round	W 84–71	20–11	Ford Center; Oklahoma City, Oklahoma
Mar 22, 2003*	(10 W)	vs. (2 W) No. 6 Kansas; Second round	L 76–108	20–12	Ford Center; Oklahoma City, Oklahoma
*Non-conference game. ^{#}Rankings from AP Poll. (#) Tournament seedings in parentheses. W=West. All times are in Mountain Time.
