= 2002–03 UCLA Bruins men's basketball team =

American college basketball season

2002–03 UCLA Bruins men's basketball
- Conference: Pacific-10
- Record: 10–19 (6–12, T-6th Pac-10)
- Head coach: Steve Lavin
- Assistant coaches: Michael Holton; Jim Saia; Steve Spencer
- Home arena: Pauley Pavilion

2002–03 Pacific-10 Conference men's basketball standings
| | Conf. | | | | Overall |
| Team | W | | L | PCT | W | | L | PCT |
|---|---|---|---|---|---|---|---|---|
| No. 5 Arizona | 17 | – | 1 | .944 | 28 | – | 4 | .875 |
| No. 20 Stanford | 14 | – | 4 | .778 | 24 | – | 9 | .727 |
| California | 13 | – | 5 | .722 | 22 | – | 9 | .710 |
| Arizona State | 11 | – | 7 | .611 | 20 | – | 12 | .625 |
| Oregon † | 10 | – | 8 | .556 | 23 | – | 10 | .697 |
| Oregon State | 6 | – | 12 | .333 | 13 | – | 15 | .464 |
| USC | 6 | – | 12 | .333 | 13 | – | 17 | .433 |
| UCLA | 6 | – | 12 | .333 | 10 | – | 19 | .345 |
| Washington | 5 | – | 13 | .278 | 10 | – | 17 | .370 |
| Washington State | 2 | – | 16 | .111 | 7 | – | 20 | .259 |
† 2003 Pac-10 tournament winner As of July 10, 2011; Rankings from Coaches Poll

The 2002–03 UCLA Bruins men's basketball team represented the University of California, Los Angeles in the 2002–03 NCAA Division I men's basketball season. The team finished 8th in the conference and lost in the second round of the Pac-10 tournament to the Oregon Ducks. The Bruins did not play in a post-season tournament. This was the final season for head coach Steve Lavin. This season was also notable as it was UCLA's first losing season since the 1947–48 season. The Bruins 54 years of consecutive winning seasons had set an NCAA record. Coach Steve Lavin was fired at the season’s end.

== Roster ==
2002–03 UCLA Bruins men's basketball team
Players
Coaches

| Pos. | # | Name | Height | Weight | Year | Hometown |
|---|---|---|---|---|---|---|
| G | 13 | Gene Barnes | 5 ft 10 in (1.78 m) | — | Fr |
| G | 21 | Cedric Bozeman | 6 ft 6 in (1.98 m) | 215 lb (98 kg) | So | Los Angeles, California |
| G | 5 | Jon Crispin | 6 ft 2 in (1.88 m) | — | Jr | Pitman, New Jersey |
| F | 43 | T. J. Cummings | 6 ft 10 in (2.08 m) | 223 lb (101 kg) | Jr | Homewood, Illinois |
| C | 45 | Michael Fey | 6 ft 11 in (2.11 m) | — | Fr |
| G | 55 | Quinn Hawking | 6 ft 2 in (1.88 m) | — | Fr |
| C | 52 | John Hoffart | 6 ft 10 in (2.08 m) | — | Jr |
| C | 15 | Ryan Hollins | 6 ft 11 in (2.11 m) | — | Fr | Pasadena, California |
| F | 54 | Josiah Johnson | 6 ft 8 in (2.03 m) | — | So |
| F | 24 | Jason Kapono (C) | 6 ft 8 in (2.03 m) | — | Sr | Long Beach, California |
| F | 4 | Marcedes Lewis | 6 ft 6 in (1.98 m) | — | Fr |
| F | 25 | Matt McKinney | 6 ft 8 in (2.03 m) | — | Fr |
| F | 5 | Andre Patterson | 6 ft 7 in (2.01 m) | — | So | Los Angeles, California |
| G | 2 | Janou Rubin | 6 ft 3 in (1.91 m) | — | Jr |
| G | 1 | Dijon Thompson | 6 ft 7 in (2.01 m) | 193 lb (88 kg) | So | Los Angeles, California |
| G | 10 | Ryan Walcott | 6 ft 1 in (1.85 m) | — | So |
| G | 22 | Ike Williams | 6 ft 2 in (1.88 m) | — | Fr |
| G | 34 | Ray Young (C) | 6 ft 4 in (1.93 m) | — | Sr |

Head coach

Steve Lavin (Chapman)

Assistant coach(es)

- Michael Holton (UCLA)
- Jim Saia (Chapman)
- Steve Spencer (Somona State)

Legend

- (C) Team captain
- (S) Suspended
- (I) Ineligible
- (W) Walk-on
- Injured
- Current redshirt

== Schedule ==
| Date time, TV | Rank^{#} | Opponent^{#} | Result | Record | Site city, state |
Exhibition
| November 13, 2002 | | Branch West; Exhibition | L 67–92 | 0–0 | Pauley Pavilion; Los Angeles, CA |
| November 19, 2002 | | EA Sports; Exhibition | L 64–70 | 0–0 | Pauley Pavilion; Los Angeles, CA |
Regular Season
| November 26, 2002; FSNW2 | No. 14 | San Diego | L 81–86 ^{OT} | 0–1 | Pauley Pavilion (6,845); Los Angeles, CA |
| November 30, 2002; CBS | No. 14 | vs. No. 4 Duke; Wooden Tradition | L 73–84 | 0–2 | Conseco Fieldhouse (18,345); Indianapolis, IN |
| December 8, 2002; FSNW2 | | Long Beach State | W 81–58 | 1–2 | Pauley Pavilion (6,358); Los Angeles, CA |
| December 14, 2002; FSNW2 | | Portland | W 105–67 | 2–2 | Pauley Pavilion (6,608); Los Angeles, CA |
| December 17, 2002 | | Northern Arizona | L 63–67 | 2–3 | Pauley Pavilion (5,736); Los Angeles, CA |
| December 21, 2002; CBS | | at No. 19 Kansas | L 70–87 | 2–4 | Allen Fieldhouse (16,300); Lawrence, KS |
| December 28, 2002; CBS | | Michigan | L 76–81 | 2–5 | Pauley Pavilion (10,001); Los Angeles, CA |
| January 2, 2003 | | at Washington | W 77–67 | 3–5 (1–0) | Hec Edmundson Pavilion (7,591); Seattle, WA |
| January 4, 2003; FSN | | at Washington State | W 98–83 | 4–5 (2–0) | Beasley Coliseum (1,658); Pullman, WA |
| January 8, 2003; FSNW | | USC | L 75–80 | 4–6 (2–1) | Pauley Pavilion (12,736); Los Angeles, CA |
| January 11, 2003; FSN | | St. John's | L 65–80 | 4–7 | Pauley Pavilion (8,503); Los Angeles, CA |
| January 16, 2003 | | Arizona State | L 64–75 | 4–8 (2–2) | Pauley Pavilion (7,710); Los Angeles, CA |
| January 18, 2003; ABC | | No. 2 Arizona | L 52–87 | 4–9 (2–3) | Pauley Pavilion (11,082); Los Angeles, CA |
| January 23, 2003 | | at Stanford | L 51–52 | 4–10 (2–4) | Maples Pavilion (7,391); Stanford, CA |
| January 25, 2003; FSN | | at No. 25 California | L 69–80 | 4–11 (2–5) | Haas Pavilion (11,877); Berkeley, CA |
| January 30, 2003; FSN | | No. 22 Oregon | L 91–96 ^{OT} | 4–12 (2–6) | Pauley Pavilion (9,008); Los Angeles, CA |
| February 1, 2003; FSNW2 | | Oregon State | L 79–83 | 4–13 (2–7) | Pauley Pavilion (7,698); Los Angeles, CA |
| February 5, 2003; FSNW2 | | at USC | L 85–86 | 4–14 (2–8) | Los Angeles Memorial Sports Arena (10,147); Los Angeles, CA |
| February 8, 2003; CBS | | at vs. Georgetown | W 71–70 | 5–14 | MCI Center (14,227); Washington D.C. |
| February 13, 2003; FSN | | at No. 1 Arizona | L 70–106 | 5–15 (2–9) | McKale Center (14,559); Tucson, AZ |
| February 15, 2003; ABC | | at Arizona State | L 69–85 | 5–16 (2–10) | Wells Fargo Arena (9,242); Tempe, AZ |
| February 20, 2003; FSN | | No. 18 California | W 76–75 ^{OT} | 6–16 (3–10) | Pauley Pavilion (8,061); Los Angeles, CA |
| February 22, 2003; FSN | | No. 21 Stanford | L 84–93 | 6–17 (3–11) | Pauley Pavilion (9,541); Los Angeles, CA |
| February 27, 2003 | | at Oregon State | W 69–66 | 7–17 (4–11) | Gill Coliseum (6,521); Corvallis, OR |
| March 01, 2003; CBS | | at Oregon | L 48–79 | 7–18 (4–12) | McArthur Court (9,087); Eugene, OR |
| March 06, 2003 | | Washington State | W 86–71 | 8–18 (5–12) | Pauley Pavilion (6,619); Los Angeles, CA |
| March 08, 2003; FSNW2 | | Washington | W 83–72 | 9–18 (6–12) | Pauley Pavilion (8,717); Los Angeles, CA |
Pac-10 Tournament
| March 13, 2003; FSN | | vs. No. 1 Arizona; First Round | W 96–89 ^{OT} | 10–18 | Staples Center (15,048); Los Angeles, CA |
| March 14, 2003; FSN | | vs. Oregon; Semifinals | L 74–75 | 10–19 | Staples Center (16,689); Los Angeles, CA |
*Non-conference game. ^{#}Rankings from AP Poll. (#) Tournament seedings in parentheses. All times are in Pacific Time.

== Notes ==
- In the first round of the Pac-10 Tournament, UCLA beat Arizona who was then ranked #1 in the nation (AP poll). The Bruins had defeated a #1 team, four years in a row (along with the victory of #1 Kansas in the previous season and #1 Stanford the two years before that).
- In spite of the losing season UCLA beat two AP Top-20 teams in 2002–03 (the other being #18 Cal). UCLA's losing season was the first in 55 years, snapping an NCAA record of consecutive winning seasons.
- The 6 wins in regular season conference play was also the lowest since the 1952–53 season (when UCLA went 6-6).
- ASU swept UCLA for the first time in 23 years (1979-80 season) and for only the second time since they joined the Pac-8.
