= 2003 Pacific-10 Conference men's basketball tournament =

- Classification: Division I
- Season: 2002–03
- Teams: 8
- Site: Staples Center; Los Angeles, California
- Champions: Oregon (1st title)
- Winning coach: Ernie Kent (1st title)

2002–03 Pacific-10 Conference men's basketball standings
	Conf.				Overall
Team	W		L	PCT	W		L	PCT
No. 5 Arizona	17	–	1	.944	28	–	4	.875
No. 20 Stanford	14	–	4	.778	24	–	9	.727
California	13	–	5	.722	22	–	9	.710
Arizona State	11	–	7	.611	20	–	12	.625
Oregon †	10	–	8	.556	23	–	10	.697
Oregon State	6	–	12	.333	13	–	15	.464
USC	6	–	12	.333	13	–	17	.433
UCLA	6	–	12	.333	10	–	19	.345
Washington	5	–	13	.278	10	–	17	.370
Washington State	2	–	16	.111	7	–	20	.259
† 2003 Pac-10 tournament winner As of July 10, 2011; Rankings from Coaches Poll

The 2003 Pacific Life Pacific-10 Conference men's basketball tournament was played between March 13 and March 15, 2003, at Staples Center in Los Angeles, California. The champion of the tournament was Oregon, which received the Pac-10's automatic bid to the NCAA tournament. Upsets defined this tournament, and for the first time, neither Arizona nor UCLA were in the final game. The Most Outstanding Player was Luke Ridnour of Oregon. It was also the first year that longtime sponsor of the tournament, Pacific Life, sponsored the event.

== Seeds ==
The top eight Pacific-10 schools play in the tournament. Teams are seeded by conference record, with a tiebreaker system used to seed teams with identical conference records.

Seed	School	Conference Record	Tiebreaker
1	Arizona	17–1	
2	Stanford	14–4	
3	California	13–5	
4	Arizona State	11–7	
5	Oregon	10–8	
6	Oregon State	6–12	
7	USC	6–12	
8	UCLA	6–12	

== Bracket ==
First Round (March 13)
1	#1 Arizona	89*
8	UCLA	96
4	Arizona State	82
5	Oregon	83
3	#24 California	69
6	Oregon State	46
2	#15 Stanford	74
7	USC	79

Semifinals (March 14)
8	UCLA	74
5	Oregon	75
3	#24 California	62
7	USC	79

Finals (March 15)
5	Oregon	74
7	USC	66

== Tournament notes ==
- This tournament opened with the lowest seed, UCLA, stunning top seed and No. 1 ranked Arizona 96–89 in overtime. The second game had another upset with 5 seed Oregon beating 4 seed Arizona State. The upsets continued into the next session with the 7 seed USC beating 2 seed Stanford 79–74. The fourth upset was when USC defeated 3 seed California.
- The championship game featured 5 seed Oregon defeating 7 seed USC 74–66. Oregon, had then become the lowest seed ever to win this tournament (although in later tournaments the 6 seed would win).
- 7 seed USC became the lowest seed ever to make the championship game of the Pac-10 Tournament (still the lowest to date).
- Also of note, this was the first time that neither of the top two seeds were in the final game, and in fact both the 1 and 2 seeds were knocked out in the first round.
- This is the only Pac-10 Tournament in which neither school from Washington participated.
- Arizona set a record for most field goal attempts in one game with 88 vs. UCLA. (33-of-88) (OT). This tournament record still stands.
- Five teams were invited to the 2003 NCAA Men's Division I Basketball Tournament
1. Arizona – 17 1 .944 28–4
2. Stanford – 14 4 .778 24–9
3. California – 13 5 .722 22–9
4. Arizona State – 11 7 .611 20–12
5. Oregon – 10 8 .556 23–10

Arizona was the #1 seed in the West Regional bracket.

== All tournament team ==
- Luke Ridnour, Oregon – Tournament MVP
- James Davis, Oregon
- Luke Jackson, Oregon
- Desmon Farmer, USC
- Rory O'Neil, USC
- Ray Young, UCLA
