= Arizona–UCLA men's basketball rivalry =

American college basketball rivalry

- Arizona Wildcats UCLA Bruins
- Sport: College Basketball
- First meeting: February 19, 1923; Arizona 30 – UCLA 43
- Latest meeting: November 3, 2026; UCLA 84 – Arizona 75
- Next meeting: TBD

Statistics
- Total meetings: 116
- All-time series: UCLA leads, 65–51
- Largest victory: UCLA by 53 (March 10, 1983)
- Longest win streak: UCLA, 11 (February 17, 1979–March 8, 1984)
- Current win streak: UCLA 1 (November 2, 2026–present)

Locations of Arizona and UCLA

The Arizona–UCLA men's basketball rivalry is a college basketball rivalry between the University of Arizona Wildcats and the UCLA Bruins.

== Series history ==
Men's Basketball Comparison
	Arizona	UCLA
First Season	1904	1919
NCAA Championships	1	11
NCAA Final Fours	5	19*
NCAA Tournament Appearances	40*	51*
Conference Championships	32	37
Conference tournament Championships	10	4
All-Americans	33	39
Consensus 1st Team All-Americans	8	21

The rivalry dates from the first games in 1923, but the true intensity of the series would not occur until the addition of Arizona to the Pac-10 in 1978. Since becoming conference foes, the game is played typically twice per season. The Wildcats and Bruins have faced off 10 times in conference tournament games.

Before the arrival of Lute Olson at Arizona, the Bruins had won 21 of 24 games against the Wildcats. UCLA had been seen as the dominant college basketball program in the west, with few teams able to challenge UCLA for the throne beyond a few wins. The rivalry did not gather steam until Lute Olson's arrival in 1984, who compiled a 28–23 record against the Bruins during his tenure as Arizona's head coach.

Since then, the two schools competed for the Pac-10 (now Pac-12) Championship every year, with the two teams winning 23 out of the 31 conference titles, and 9 of 18 conference tournament titles. Arizona clinched their first conference title in 1986, when they won on the road at UCLA in Olson's third season. The UCLA-Arizona basketball rivalry was seen as the match up of the two premier teams in the conference during their time in the Pac-12. Also, the performance of the two schools influences the national opinion of the conference. Mike Montgomery, former head coach at both Cal and Stanford has stated, "...If those two are not good, the conference is not perceived as being good. People don't give credit to the schools across the board in the league."

After the end of the 2023−24 season, Arizona moved to the Big 12 Conference and UCLA moved to the Big Ten Conference, there was speculation if the rivalry would continue. The two teams agree to a three game series in neutral site locations. The 2024 game was played at the Footprint Center in Phoenix, the 2025 game was played at the Intuit Dome in Inglewood, CA and the 2026 game was played at the T-Mobile Arena in Las Vegas. Following the game in 2026, there has not been an announcement when the series would continue but both coaches, Tommy Lloyd and Mick Cronin, have stated they would like for the rivalry to return to traditional on-site campus games.

== Results ==
Arizona victories	UCLA victories	Ties

No.	Date	Location	Winner	Score
1	February 19, 1923	Los Angeles, CA	UCLA	43–30
2	February 20, 1923	Los Angeles, CA	Arizona	33–22
3	February 26, 1923	Tucson, AZ	UCLA	30–23
4	February 27, 1923	Tucson, AZ	Arizona	32–22
5	January 26, 1951	San Francisco, CA	UCLA	69–63
6	December 11, 1953	Los Angeles, CA	UCLA	90–45
7	December 12, 1953	Los Angeles, CA	#10 UCLA	84–48
8	January 12, 1961	Los Angeles, CA	UCLA	90–68
9	December 28, 1964	Los Angeles, CA	#4 UCLA	99–79
10	January 31, 1966	Los Angeles, CA	#10 UCLA	84–67
11	December 1, 1969	Los Angeles, CA	#4 UCLA	90–65
12	March 20, 1976 (Note: 1976 NCAA Elite Eight)	Los Angeles, CA	#5 UCLA	82–66
13	December 29, 1977	Los Angeles, CA	#8 UCLA	85–63
14	January 18, 1979	Tucson, AZ	Arizona	70–69
15	February 17, 1979	Los Angeles, CA	#2 UCLA	110–86
16	January 21, 1980	Los Angeles, CA	UCLA	69–59
17	February 16, 1980	Tucson, AZ	UCLA	90–78
18	January 17, 1981	Tucson, AZ	#8 UCLA	79–76
19	February 12, 1981	Los Angeles, CA	#8 UCLA	90–79
20	January 16, 1982	Los Angeles, CA	UCLA	65–56
21	February 12, 1982	Tucson, AZ	UCLA	88–73
22	January 8, 1983	Tucson, AZ	#6 UCLA	92–78
23	March 10, 1983	Los Angeles, CA	#4 UCLA	111–58
24	January 7, 1984	Tucson, AZ	#6 UCLA	61–58
25	March 8, 1984	Los Angeles, CA	UCLA	68–60
26	January 19, 1985	Tucson, AZ	Arizona	53–52
27	March 2, 1985	Los Angeles, CA	UCLA	58–54
28	February 13, 1986	Tucson, AZ	Arizona	85–60
29	March 3, 1986	Los Angeles, CA	Arizona	88–76
30	January 10, 1987	Tucson, AZ	UCLA	84–83
31	February 12, 1987	Los Angeles, CA	UCLA	81–65
32	January 24, 1988	Tucson, AZ	#1 Arizona	86–74
33	February 20, 1988	Los Angeles, CA	#3 Arizona	78–76
34	February 18, 1989	Tucson, AZ	#2 Arizona	102–62
35	March 4, 1989	Los Angeles, CA	#1 Arizona	89–86
36	January 13, 1990	Los Angeles, CA	#19 UCLA	73–67
37	February 10, 1990	Tucson, AZ	#22 Arizona	83–74
38	March 11, 1990 (Note: 1990 Pacific-10 Conference men's basketball tournament)	Tempe, AZ	#15 Arizona	94–78
39	January 12, 1991	Tucson, AZ	#6 Arizona	82–77
40	February 10, 1991	Los Angeles, CA	#5 Arizona	105–94
41	January 11, 1992	Tucson, AZ	#2 UCLA	89–87
42	March 12, 1992	Los Angeles, CA	#8 UCLA	89–81
43	January 7, 1993	Los Angeles, CA	#20 Arizona	82–80
44	March 13, 1993	Tucson, AZ	#6 Arizona	99–80
45	January 20, 1994	Los Angeles, CA	#2 UCLA	74–66
46	February 19, 1994	Tucson, AZ	#15 Arizona	98–74
47	January 19, 1995	Tucson, AZ	#4 UCLA	71–61
48	February 18, 1995	Tucson, AZ	#6 UCLA	72–70
49	January 20, 1996	Tucson, AZ	#18 Arizona	88–79
50	February 15, 1996	Los Angeles, CA	#18 UCLA	76–75
51	January 18, 1997	Los Angeles, CA	UCLA	79–62
52	February 13, 1997	Tucson, AZ	#24 UCLA	66–64
53	January 3, 1998	Tucson, AZ	#8 Arizona	87–75
54	March 7, 1998	Los Angeles, CA	#2 Arizona	91–87
55	January 2, 1999	Los Angeles, CA	#10 UCLA	82–75
56	March 6, 1999	Tucson, AZ	#13 Arizona	87–70
57	January 20, 2000	Los Angeles, CA	#2 Arizona	76–61
58	February 19, 2000	Tucson, AZ	#4 Arizona	88–63
59	January 20, 2001	Tucson, AZ	#17 Arizona	88–63

No.	Date	Location	Winner	Score
60	February 15, 2001	Los Angeles, CA	#24 UCLA	79–77
61	January 19, 2002	Tucson, AZ	#15 Arizona	96–86
62	February 14, 2002	Los Angeles, CA	#20 UCLA	77–76
63	January 18, 2003	Los Angeles, CA	#2 Arizona	87–52
64	February 13, 2003	Tucson, AZ	#1 Arizona	106–70
65	March 13, 2003 (Note: 2003 Pacific-10 Conference men's basketball tournament)	Los Angeles, CA	UCLA	96–89
66	January 17, 2004	Los Angeles, CA	#7 Arizona	97–72
67	February 14, 2004	Tucson, AZ	#16 Arizona	107–83
68	January 15, 2005	Tucson, AZ	#17 Arizona	76–73
69	February 12, 2005	Los Angeles, CA	#12 Arizona	83–73
70	January 5, 2006	Tucson, AZ	#17 UCLA	85–79
71	February 4, 2006	Los Angeles, CA	#14 UCLA	84–73
72	March 10, 2006 (Note: 2006 Pacific-10 Conference men's basketball tournament)	Los Angeles, CA	#13 UCLA	71–59
73	January 20, 2007	Los Angeles, CA	#3 UCLA	73–69
74	February 17, 2007	Tucson, AZ	#5 UCLA	81–66
75	February 8, 2008	Los Angeles, CA	#5 UCLA	82–60
76	March 2, 2008	Tucson, AZ	#4 UCLA	68–66
77	January 15, 2009	Los Angeles, CA	#9 UCLA	83–60
78	February 14, 2009	Tucson, AZ	Arizona	84–72
79	January 2, 2010	Los Angeles, CA	Arizona	77–63
80	March 4, 2010	Tucson, AZ	Arizona	78–73
81	March 11, 2010 (Note: 2010 Pacific-10 Conference men's basketball tournament)	Los Angeles, CA	UCLA	75–69
82	January 27, 2011	Tucson, AZ	Arizona	85–74
83	February 26, 2011	Los Angeles, CA	UCLA	71–49
84	January 5, 2012	Los Angeles, CA	UCLA	65–58
85	February 25, 2012	Tucson, AZ	Arizona	65–63
86	March 8, 2012 (Note: 2012 Pac-12 Conference men's basketball tournament)	Los Angeles, CA	Arizona	66–58
87	January 24, 2013	Tucson, AZ	UCLA	84–73
88	March 2, 2013	Los Angeles, CA	UCLA	74–69
89	March 15, 2013 (Note: 2013 Pac-12 Conference men's basketball tournament)	Las Vegas, NV	#24 UCLA	66–64
90	January 9, 2014	Los Angeles, CA	#1 Arizona	79–75
91	March 15, 2014 (Note: 2014 Pac-12 Conference men's basketball tournament)	Las Vegas, NV	UCLA	75–71
92	February 21, 2015	Tucson, AZ	#7 Arizona	57–47
93	March 13, 2015 (Note: 2015 Pac-12 Conference men's basketball tournament)	Las Vegas, NV	#5 Arizona	70–64
94	January 7, 2016	Los Angeles, CA	UCLA	87–84
95	February 12, 2016	Tucson, AZ	#17 Arizona	81–75
96	January 21, 2017	Los Angeles, CA	#14 Arizona	96–85
97	February 25, 2017	Tucson, AZ	#5 UCLA	77–72
98	March 10, 2017 (Note: 2017 Pac-12 Conference men's basketball tournament)	Las Vegas, NV	#7 Arizona	86–75
99	February 8, 2018	Tucson, AZ	UCLA	82–74
100	March 9, 2018 (Note: 2018 Pac-12 Conference men's basketball tournament)	Las Vegas, NV	#15 Arizona	78–67
101	January 26, 2019	Los Angeles, CA	UCLA	90–69
102	February 8, 2020	Tucson, AZ	UCLA	65–52
103	February 29, 2020	Los Angeles, CA	UCLA	69–64
104	January 9, 2021	Tucson, AZ	UCLA	81–76
105	February 18, 2021	Los Angeles, CA	UCLA	74–60
106	January 25, 2022	Los Angeles, CA	#7 UCLA	75–59
107	February 3, 2022	Tucson, AZ	#7 Arizona	76–66
108	March 12, 2022 (Note: 2022 Pac-12 Conference men's basketball tournament)	Las Vegas, NV	#2 Arizona	84–76
109	January 21, 2023	Tucson, AZ	#11 Arizona	58–52
110	March 4, 2023	Los Angeles, CA	#4 UCLA	82–73
111	March 11, 2023	Las Vegas, NV	#8 Arizona	61–59
112	January 20, 2024	Tucson, AZ	#12 Arizona	77–71
113	March 7, 2024	Los Angeles, CA	#5 Arizona	88–65
114	December 14, 2024	Phoenix, AZ	#24 UCLA	57–54
115	November 14, 2025	Inglewood, CA	#5 Arizona	69–65
116	November 2, 2026	Las Vegas, NV	#22 UCLA	84–75
Series: UCLA leads 65–51

=== Results by location ===
City	Games	Arizona victories	UCLA victories	Years played
McKale Center	46	28	18	1923–present
Pauley Pavilion	53	15	38	1923–present
Neutral Site	17	8	9	1951–present

=== Current Coach Results ===
Coach	Games	Wins	Losses	Winning Percentage
Tommy Lloyd	11	7	4	.636
Mick Cronin	15	8	7	.533

== Future Games ==
No future games have been announced as of November 2, 2026.

== Ranked meetings ==
Arizona & UCLA have played 37 games when both programs were ranked. UCLA holds the overall advantage 21–16.

	Date	Home	Away	Result	Significance	Standing
1	March 20, 1976	No. 5 UCLA†	No. 15 Arizona †	82−66	1976 NCAA Division I Basketball Tournament	1−0
2	December 29, 1977	No. 8 UCLA	No. 15 Arizona	85−63	–	2−0
3	January 13, 1990	No. 19 UCLA	No. 18 Arizona	73−67	1st match up in series history while members of the same Pac-10 conference & both teams were ranked	3−0
4	January 12, 1991	No. 6 Arizona	No. 7 UCLA	82−77	–	3−1
5	February 10, 1991	No. 14 UCLA	No. 5 Arizona	105−94^{OT}	–	3−2
6	January 11, 1992	No. 6 Arizona	No. 2 UCLA	89−87	First match up between both programs ranked inside the top 10. Ended Arizona's 71 game home winning streak, 10th longest streak in NCAA history.	4−2
7	March 12, 1992	No. 8 UCLA	No. 2 Arizona	89−81	–	5−2
8	January 7, 1993	No. 15 UCLA	No. 20 Arizona	82−80		5−3
9	January 20, 1994	No. 2 UCLA	No. 9 Arizona	74−66	–	6−3
10	February 19, 1994	No. 15 Arizona	No. 8 UCLA	98−74	Largest margin of victory (24 points) by either program while both programs were ranked	6−4
11	January 19, 1995	No. 11 Arizona	No. 4 UCLA	71−61		7−4
12	February 18, 1995	No. 6 UCLA	No. 12 Arizona	72−70		8−4
13	January 20, 1996	No. 18 Arizona	No. 13 UCLA	88−79	–	8−5
14	February 15, 1996	No. 18 UCLA	No. 13 Arizona	76−75	–	9−5
15	February 13, 1997	No. 11 Arizona	No. 24 UCLA	66−64	–	10−5
16	January 3, 1998	No. 8 Arizona	No. 9 UCLA	87−75	–	10−6
17	January 2, 1999	No. 10 UCLA	No. 6 Arizona	82−75		11−6
18	March 6, 1999	No. 13 Arizona	No. 12 UCLA	87−70		11−7
19	January 20, 2000	No. 25 UCLA	No. 2 Arizona	75−61		11−8
20	February 15, 2001	No. 24 UCLA	No. 8 Arizona	79−77		12−8
21	January 19, 2002	No. 15 Arizona	No. 9 UCLA	96−86		12−9
22	February 14, 2002	No. 20 UCLA	No. 9 Arizona	77−76		13−9
23	January 5, 2006	No. 21 Arizona	No. 17 UCLA	85−79		14−9
24	January 20, 2007	No. 3 UCLA	No. 11 Arizona	73−69		15−9
25	February 17, 2007	No. 19 Arizona	No. 5 UCLA	81−66	Lute Olson's final game against UCLA, would finish with a 28–23 record all-time versus UCLA	16−9
26	March 15, 2013	No. 24 UCLA†	No. 21 Arizona†	66−64	2013 Pac-12 Conference men's basketball tournament	17−9
27	January 21, 2017	No.3 UCLA	No. 14 Arizona	96−85		17−10
28	February 25, 2017	No. 4 Arizona	No. 5 UCLA	77−72	First meeting with both programs ranked in the top 5. First meeting on College GameDay & 4th College GameDay meeting overall (UCLA 3−1)	18−10
29	March 10, 2017	No. 4 Arizona†	No. 5 UCLA †	86−75	2017 Pac-12 Conference men's basketball tournament	18−11
30	January 25, 2022	No. 7 UCLA	No. 3 Arizona	75−59	Tommy Lloyd first Arizona/UCLA game	19−11
31	February 3, 2022	No. 7 Arizona	No. 3 UCLA	76−66		19−12
32	March 12, 2022	No. 2 Arizona†	No. 13 UCLA †	84−76	2022 Pac-12 Conference men's basketball tournament	19−13
33	January 21, 2023	No. 11 Arizona	No. 5 UCLA	58−52	−	19−14
34	March 4, 2023	No. 4 UCLA	No. 8 Arizona	82−73	−	20−14
35	March 11, 2023	No. 2 UCLA†	No. 8 Arizona†	61−59	2023 Pac-12 Conference men's basketball tournament	20−15
36	November 14, 2025	No. 5 Arizona†	No. 15 UCLA†	69−65	Hall of Fame Series − Los Angeles	20−16
37	November 2, 2026	No. 5 Arizona†	No. 22 UCLA	84−75	Hall of Fame Series − Las Vegas	21−16

Notes: † Denotes game was neutral site
