= 2002–03 Stanford Cardinal men's basketball team =

American college basketball season

2002–03 Stanford Cardinal men's basketball

NCAA tournament, second round
- Conference: Pacific-10 Conference

Ranking
- Coaches: No. 20
- AP: No. 18
- Record: 24–9 (14–4 Pac-10)
- Head coach: Mike Montgomery (17th season)
- Assistant coaches: Tony Fuller; Eric Reveno; Russell Turner
- Home arena: Maples Pavilion (Capacity: 7,392)

2002–03 Pacific-10 Conference men's basketball standings
	Conf.				Overall
Team	W		L	PCT	W		L	PCT
No. 5 Arizona	17	–	1	.944	28	–	4	.875
No. 20 Stanford	14	–	4	.778	24	–	9	.727
California	13	–	5	.722	22	–	9	.710
Arizona State	11	–	7	.611	20	–	12	.625
Oregon †	10	–	8	.556	23	–	10	.697
Oregon State	6	–	12	.333	13	–	15	.464
USC	6	–	12	.333	13	–	17	.433
UCLA	6	–	12	.333	10	–	19	.345
Washington	5	–	13	.278	10	–	17	.370
Washington State	2	–	16	.111	7	–	20	.259
† 2003 Pac-10 tournament winner As of July 10, 2011; Rankings from Coaches Poll

The 2002–03 Stanford Cardinal men's basketball team represented Stanford University during the 2002–03 NCAA Division I men's basketball season. The team finished second in the Pacific-10 Conference with a 14–4 conference record, 24–9 overall. The Cardinal competed in the 2003 NCAA Division I men's basketball tournament, losing to Connecticut in the Second round.

== Roster ==
2002–03 Stanford Cardinal men's basketball team
Players
Coaches

Pos.	#	Name	Height	Weight	Year	Previous school	Hometown
F	1	Josh Childress	6 ft 8 in (2.03 m)	210 lb (95 kg)	So	Mayfair
F	21	Nick Robinson	6 ft 6 in (1.98 m)	200 lb (91 kg)	So		Liberty, Missouri
G	24	Julius Barnes	6 ft 1 in (1.85 m)	185 lb (84 kg)	Sr		Rowland Heights, California
G	33	Matt Lottich	6 ft 4 in (1.93 m)	205 lb (93 kg)	Jr	New Trier	Winnetka, Illinois

Head coach

- Mike Montgomery (Long Beach State)

Assistant coach(es)

Legend

- (C) Team captain
- (S) Suspended
- (I) Ineligible
- (W) Walk-on
- Injured
- Current redshirt

Roster

== Schedule ==
Date time, TV	Rank^{#}	Opponent^{#}	Result	Record	Site city, state
Regular season
Nov 18, 2002*		Boston University; Preseason NIT	W 61–57	1–0	Maples Pavilion; Stanford, California
Nov 20, 2002*		No. 11 Xavier; Preseason NIT	W 63–62	2–0	Maples Pavilion; Stanford, California
Nov 24, 2002*		Rice	W 79–62	3–0	Maples Pavilion; Stanford, California
Nov 27, 2002*		vs. No. 7 Florida; Preseason NIT	W 69–65	4–0	Madison Square Garden; New York, New York
Nov 29, 2002*		vs. North Carolina; Preseason NIT	L 57–74	4–1	Madison Square Garden; New York, New York
Dec 14, 2002*	No. 19	Saint Mary's	W 76–58	5–1	Maples Pavilion; Stanford, California
Dec 16, 2002*	No. 17	Montana	L 68–70	5–2	Maples Pavilion; Stanford, California
Mar 8, 2003*	No. 17	No. 22 California	W 72–60	23–7 (14–4)	Maples Pavilion; Stanford, California
Pac-10 tournament
Mar 13, 2003*	(2) No. 15	vs. (7) USC; Quarterfinals	L 74–79	23–8	Staples Center; Los Angeles, California
NCAA tournament
Mar 20, 2003*	(4 S) No. 18	vs. (13 S) San Diego; First Round	W 77–69	24–8	Spokane Veterans Memorial Arena; Spokane, Washington
Mar 22, 2003*	(4 S) No. 18	vs. (5 S) No. 23 Connecticut; Second Round	L 74–85	24–9	Spokane Veterans Memorial Arena (11,271); Spokane, Washington
*Non-conference game. ^{#}Rankings from AP poll. (#) Tournament seedings in parentheses. All times are in Pacific Time. (#) during NCAA is seed within region. S = South Region.

Schedule Source:

== Rankings ==
Ranking movements Legend: ██ Increase in ranking ██ Decrease in ranking — = Not ranked
	Week																			
Poll	Pre	1	2	3	4	5	6	7	8	9	10	11	12	13	14	15	16	17	18	Final
AP	—	—	—	17	19	17	—	—	—	—	—	—	25	24	21	19	17	15	18	Not released
Coaches	—	—	—	22	20	21	—	—	—	—	—	—	—	24	21	19	17	14	16	20

*AP does not release post-NCAA Tournament rankings
