= 2002–03 California Golden Bears men's basketball team =

American college basketball season

2002–03 California Golden Bears men's basketball

NCAA tournament, second round
- Conference: Pacific-10 Conference
- Record: 22–9 (13–5 Pac-10)
- Head coach: Ben Braun (7th season)
- Assistant coach: Joe Pasternack (2nd season)
- Home arena: Harmon Gym

2002–03 Pacific-10 Conference men's basketball standings
	Conf.				Overall
Team	W		L	PCT	W		L	PCT
No. 5 Arizona	17	–	1	.944	28	–	4	.875
No. 20 Stanford	14	–	4	.778	24	–	9	.727
California	13	–	5	.722	22	–	9	.710
Arizona State	11	–	7	.611	20	–	12	.625
Oregon †	10	–	8	.556	23	–	10	.697
Oregon State	6	–	12	.333	13	–	15	.464
USC	6	–	12	.333	13	–	17	.433
UCLA	6	–	12	.333	10	–	19	.345
Washington	5	–	13	.278	10	–	17	.370
Washington State	2	–	16	.111	7	–	20	.259
† 2003 Pac-10 tournament winner As of July 10, 2011; Rankings from Coaches Poll

The 2002–03 California Golden Bears men's basketball team represented the University of California, Berkeley during the 2002–03 season.

Led by head coach Ben Braun, the Bears finished the regular season with a 13–5 record in the Pac-10, placing them in third. The Bears received an at-large bid into the NCAA tournament, where they defeated NC State before falling to Oklahoma in the second round. The team finished the season with an overall record of 22–9.

== Roster ==
2002–03 California Golden Bears men's basketball team
Players
Coaches

Pos.	#	Name	Height	Weight	Year	Hometown
F	0	Rod Benson	6 ft 10 in (2.08 m)	195 lb (88 kg)	Fr	San Diego, California
G	1	Tashaan Forehan-Kelly (W)	6 ft 3 in (1.91 m)	170 lb (77 kg)	So	Irvine, California
G	2	A.J. Diggs	5 ft 9 in (1.75 m)	175 lb (79 kg)	Jr	Long Beach, California
G	3	Donte Smith	6 ft 2 in (1.88 m)	190 lb (86 kg)	RS Sr	Washington, D.C.
F	10	Jordi Geli Vilardell	6 ft 10 in (2.08 m)	190 lb (86 kg)	Fr	Girona, Spain
G	15	Richard Midgley	6 ft 1 in (1.85 m)	200 lb (91 kg)	Fr	Burgess Hill, England
G	20	Martin Smith (W)	5 ft 11 in (1.8 m)	155 lb (70 kg)	Fr	Escondido, California
F	22	Mark Thompson (W)	6 ft 4 in (1.93 m)	215 lb (98 kg)	Jr	Santa Rosa, California
F	24	Amit Tamir	6 ft 11 in (2.11 m)	260 lb (118 kg)	So	Jerusalem
G	25	Brian Wethers	6 ft 5 in (1.96 m)	210 lb (95 kg)	Sr	Murietta, California
F	30	Erik Bond	6 ft 7 in (2.01 m)	205 lb (93 kg)	RS Fr	Seattle, Washington
C	33	Gabriel Hughes	6 ft 11 in (2.11 m)	225 lb (102 kg)	Jr	Carson, California
F	34	Joe Shipp	6 ft 5 in (1.96 m)	220 lb (100 kg)	Sr	Los Angeles, California
F	35	Steve Panawek (W)	6 ft 5 in (1.96 m)	190 lb (86 kg)	Fr	Moraga, California
F	40	Conor Famulener	6 ft 6 in (1.98 m)	230 lb (104 kg)	Jr	Walnut Creek, California
F	55	David Paris	6 ft 9 in (2.06 m)	260 lb (118 kg)	Fr	Modesto, California

Head coach

- Ben Braun

Assistant coach(es)

- Joe Pasternack

Legend

- (C) Team captain
- (S) Suspended
- (I) Ineligible
- (W) Walk-on
- Injured
- Current redshirt

Roster
Last update: 13 March 2025

== Schedule and results ==
Date time, TV	Rank^{#}	Opponent^{#}	Result	Record	Site city, state
Regular season
November 23, 2002*		at New Mexico	W 76-68	1–0	The Pit; Albuquerque, New Mexico
November 30, 2002*		at Cleveland State	W 73-64	2–0	Goodman Arena; Cleveland, Ohio
December 3, 2002*		Howard	W 80-70	3–0	Haas Pavilion; Berkeley, California
December 7, 2002*		vs. Georgia; Wooden Classic	L 73-78 ^{OT}	3–1	Arrowhead Pond; Anaheim, CA
December 10, 2002*		UC Santa Barbara	W 67-60	4–1	Haas Pavilion; Berkeley, California
December 20, 2002*		Grambling; EA Sports Golden Bear Classic	W 84-65	5–1	Haas Pavilion; Berkeley, California
December 21, 2002*		Louisiana-Lafayette; EA Sports Golden Bear Classic	W 77-61	6–1	Haas Pavilion; Berkeley, California
December 28, 2002*		vs. No. 19 Kansas; Pete Newell Challenge	L 67–80	6–2	Oakland Arena (14,170); Oakland, California
December 30, 2002*		San Francisco	W 77-70	7–2	Haas Pavilion; Berkeley, California
January 4, 2003		Stanford	W 72-59	8–2 (1–0)	Haas Pavilion; Berkeley, California
January 9, 2003		Oregon	W 88-72	9–2 (2–0)	Haas Pavilion; Berkeley, California
January 11, 2003		Oregon State	W 78-73	10–2 (3–0)	Haas Pavilion; Berkeley, California
January 16, 2003		at Washington	W 73-66	11–2 (4–0)	Bank of America Arena; Seattle, Washington
January 18, 2003		at Washington State	W 76-63	12–2 (5–0)	Beasley Coliseum; Pullman, Washington
January 23, 2003	No. 25	USC	W 73-68	13–2 (6–0)	Haas Pavilion; Berkeley, California
January 25, 2003	No. 25	UCLA	W 80–69	14–2 (7–0)	Haas Pavilion; Berkeley, California
January 30, 2003	No. 20	at Arizona State	L 70-75	14–3 (7–1)	Wells Fargo Arena; Tempe, Arizona
February 1, 2003	No. 20	at No. 1 Arizona	L 80-95	14–4 (7–2)	McKale Center; Tucson, Arizona
February 6, 2003		at Oregon State	W 84-71	15–4 (8–2)	Gill Coliseum; Corvallis, Oregon
February 8, 2003		at Oregon	W 86-75	16–4 (9–2)	McArthur Court; Eugene, Oregon
February 13, 2003	No. 22	Washington State	W 63-53	17–4 (10–2)	Haas Pavilion; Berkeley, California
February 15, 2003	No. 22	Washington	W 58-53	18–4 (11–2)	Haas Pavilion; Berkeley, California
February 20, 2003	No. 18	at UCLA	L 75-76	18–5 (11–3)	Pauley Pavilion; Los Angeles, California
February 22, 2003	No. 18	USC	W 84-82	19–5 (12–3)	Los Angeles Sports Arena; Los Angeles, California
February 27, 2003	No. 23	No. 1 Arizona	L 75-88	19–6 (12–4)	Haas Pavilion; Berkeley, California
March 2, 2003	No. 23	Arizona State	W 80-72	20–6 (13–4)	Haas Pavilion; Berkeley, California
March 8, 2003	No. 22	at No. 17 Stanford	L 60–72	20–7 (13–5)	Maples Pavilion; Stanford, California
Pac-10 Tournament
March 13, 2003*	(3) No. 24	vs. (6) Oregon State; Quarterfinals	W 69–46	21–7	Staples Center; Los Angeles, California
March 14, 2003*	(3) No. 24	vs. (7) USC; Semifinals	L 62–79	21–8	Staples Center; Los Angeles, California
NCAA Tournament
March 20, 2003*	(8 E)	vs. (9 E) NC State; First Round	W 76–74 ^{OT}	22–8	Ford Center; Oklahoma City, Oklahoma
March 22, 2003*	(8 E)	vs. (1 E) No. 3 Oklahoma; Second Round	L 65–74	22–9	Ford Center; Oklahoma City, Oklahoma
*Non-conference game. ^{#}Rankings from AP Poll. (#) Tournament seedings in parentheses. E=East. All times are in Pacific.
