= 2002–03 Oregon Ducks men's basketball team =

American college basketball season

2002–03 Oregon Ducks men's basketball

Pac-10 Tournament Champions

NCAA tournament, round of 64
- Conference: Pacific-10 Conference
- Record: 23-10 (10-8 Pac-10)
- Head coach: Ernie Kent
- Assistant coaches: Mark Hudson; Kenny Payne
- Home arena: McArthur Court

2002–03 Pacific-10 Conference men's basketball standings
	Conf.				Overall
Team	W		L	PCT	W		L	PCT
No. 5 Arizona	17	–	1	.944	28	–	4	.875
No. 20 Stanford	14	–	4	.778	24	–	9	.727
California	13	–	5	.722	22	–	9	.710
Arizona State	11	–	7	.611	20	–	12	.625
Oregon †	10	–	8	.556	23	–	10	.697
Oregon State	6	–	12	.333	13	–	15	.464
USC	6	–	12	.333	13	–	17	.433
UCLA	6	–	12	.333	10	–	19	.345
Washington	5	–	13	.278	10	–	17	.370
Washington State	2	–	16	.111	7	–	20	.259
† 2003 Pac-10 tournament winner As of July 10, 2011; Rankings from Coaches Poll

The 2002–03 Oregon Ducks men's basketball team competed in the Pac-10 Conference, achieving a record of 10–8 within the conference, and a record of 23–10 overall. The team was coached by Ernie Kent.

The Ducks were champions of the 2003 Pacific-10 Conference men's basketball tournament, beating USC in the final, 74–66. Oregon entered the 2003 NCAA Division I men's basketball tournament as a #8 seed in the Midwest Region. The team lost in the first round of the tournament, being upset by #9 Utah, 58–60.

== Roster ==
2002–03 Oregon Ducks men's basketball team
Players
Coaches

Pos.	#	Name	Height	Weight	Year	Hometown
G	13	Luke Ridnour	6 ft 2 in (1.88 m)	170 lb (77 kg)	Jr	Blaine, Washington
G	33	Luke Jackson	6 ft 7 in (2.01 m)	210 lb (95 kg)	Jr	Creswell, Oregon

Head coach

- Ernie Kent (Oregon)

Assistant coach(es)

Legend

- (C) Team captain
- (S) Suspended
- (I) Ineligible
- (W) Walk-on
- Injured
- Current redshirt

== Schedule and results ==
Date time, TV	Rank^{#}	Opponent^{#}	Result	Record	Site city, state
Regular Season
Dec 17, 2002*	No. 5	vs. Cincinnati	L 52–77	6–1	Continental Airlines Arena; East Rutherford, New Jersey
Pac-10 Tournament
Mar 13, 2003*		vs. Arizona State; Quarterfinals	W 83–82	21–9	Staples Center; Los Angeles, California
Mar 14, 2003*		vs. UCLA; Semifinals	W 75–74	22–9	Staples Center; Los Angeles, California
Mar 15, 2003*		vs. USC; Championship game	W 74–66	23–9	Staples Center; Los Angeles, California
NCAA Tournament
Mar 21, 2003*	(8 MW)	vs. (9 MW) Utah; First Round	L 58–60	23–10	Bridgestone Arena; Nashville, Tennessee
*Non-conference game. ^{#}Rankings from AP Poll. (#) Tournament seedings in parentheses. MW=Midwest.

== NBA draft ==
Round	Pick	Player	NBA club
1	14	Luke Ridnour	Seattle SuperSonics
