= Paul Graham (basketball coach) =

American basketball coach (born 1951)

Biographical details
- Born: March 11, 1951 (age 75); Kansas City, Kansas, U.S.
- Education: North Texas

Coaching career (HC unless noted)
- 1974–1982: Kimball HS
- 1982–1988: SMU (asst.)
- 1990–1992: New Mexico (assistant)
- 1992–1999: Oklahoma State (assistant)
- 1999–2003: Washington State
- 2003–2007: Colorado (assistant)
- 2007–2011: Georgia State (assistant)
- 2011: Georgia State (interim HC)
- 2011–2021: Skyline HS

Paul Graham (born March 11, 1951) is an American former basketball coach. He served as the head men's basketball coach at Washington State University from 1999 to 2003.

== Career ==
From 1992 to 1999, Graham worked under Eddie Sutton as an assistant at Oklahoma State.

In March 1999, Washington State University hired Graham, giving him his first head coaching position at the college level. The Cougars struggled while he was their head coach, posting a 31–79 record; the team failed to win 10 games in three of his four seasons. Washington State fired Graham following the 2002–03 season.

After his firing, Graham joined Colorado as an assistant, staying there through the 2006–07 season. Graham then took an assistant job at Georgia State under Rod Barnes, and remained there through the 2010–2011 season.

In 2011 Graham returned to Dallas, Texas and joined the Skyline High School staff as an assistant coach, and in 2012 as their head coach. During the 2013–14 Season Graham led the Raiders to a share of the 5A Region II District 9 Championship with an 11–3 district record.

Graham retired from coaching following the 2021 season.
