= 2002–03 NCAA Division I men's basketball rankings =

- Season: 2002–03
- NCAA Tournament: 2003
- Preseason No. 1: Arizona
- NCAA Tournament Champions: Syracuse
NCAA Division I men's basketball rankings


The 2002–03 NCAA Division I men's basketball rankings was made up of two human polls, the AP Poll and the Coaches Poll, in addition to various other preseason polls.

== Legend ==
	Increase in ranking
	Decrease in ranking
	New to rankings from previous week
Italics	Number of first place votes
(#–#)	Win–loss record
т	Tied with team above or below also with this symbol

== AP Poll ==
	Preseason Pre	Week 2 Nov. 19	Week 3 Nov. 26	Week 4 Dec. 4	Week 5 Dec. 11	Week 6 Dec. 18	Week 7 Dec. 25	Week 8 Jan. 1	Week 9 Jan. 8	Week 10 Jan. 15	Week 11 Jan. 22	Week 12 Jan. 29	Week 13 Feb. 5	Week 14 Feb. 12	Week 15 Feb. 19	Week 16 Feb. 26	Week 17 Mar. 5	Week 18 Mar. 12	Final Mar. 19	
1.	Arizona (50)	Arizona (0–0) (58)	Arizona (1–0) (60)	Arizona (2–0) (71)	Arizona (4–0) (70)	Arizona (5–0) (69)	Alabama (8–0) (35)	Alabama (9–0) (35)	Duke (9–0) (54)	Duke (11–0) (57)	Arizona (13–1) (67)	Arizona (15–1) (71)	Florida (18–2) (50)	Arizona (18–2) (37)	Arizona (20–2) (59)	Arizona (21–2) (58)	Arizona (23–2) (59)	Arizona (25–2) (51)	Kentucky (29–3)	1.
2.	Kansas (14)	Kansas (0–0) (10)	Kansas (2–0) (9)	Texas (4–0)	Alabama (6–0)	Alabama (7–0)	Pittsburgh (8–0) (14)	Pittsburgh (9–0) (16)	Arizona (9–1) (15)	Arizona (11–1) (15)	Pittsburgh (14–1) (3)	Pittsburgh (15–1)	Arizona (16–2) (13)	Louisville (18–1) (27)	Kentucky (20–3) (13)	Kentucky (22–3) (14)	Kentucky (24–3) (13)	Kentucky (26–3) (21)	Arizona (25–3)	2.
3.	Oklahoma (6)	Texas (1–0)	Texas (2–0)	Alabama (4–0)	Duke (5–0)	Duke (5–0)	Duke (6–0) (16)	Duke (7–0) (14)	Connecticut (9–0) (1)	Pittsburgh (12–1)	Duke (12–1) (1)	Texas (13–2)	Texas (14–3) (5)	Kentucky (18–3) (5)	Texas (17–4)	Oklahoma (19–4)	Florida (24–4)	Texas (22–5)	Oklahoma (24–6)	3.
4.	Texas	Alabama (1–0)	Alabama (2–0)	Duke (3–0)	Pittsburgh (5–0) (1)	Pittsburgh (6–0) (1)	Arizona (5–1) (5)	Arizona (6–1) (5)	Alabama (10–1)	Texas (10–2)	Texas (12–2)	Florida (16–2) (1)	Pittsburgh (15–2)	Florida (19–3) (2)	Louisville (19–2)	Florida (22–4)	Texas (20–5)	Kansas (24–6)	Pittsburgh (26–4)	4.
5.	Pittsburgh (1)	Pittsburgh (0–0) (1)	Pittsburgh (1–0) (1)	Pittsburgh (3–0) (1)	Oregon (5–0)	Oregon (6–0)	Oklahoma (6–1)	Connecticut (8–0)	Notre Dame (12–1)	Oklahoma (10–2)	Florida (15–2) (1)	Duke (13–2)	Louisville (16–1) (4)	Oklahoma (16–3) (1)	Oklahoma (17–4)	Texas (18–5)	Oklahoma (20–5)	Pittsburgh (23–4)	Texas (22–6)	5.
6.	Duke	Duke (0–0)	Duke (1–0)	Oklahoma (3–1)	Oklahoma (4–1)	Indiana (8–0)	Connecticut (7–0)	Notre Dame (10–1)	Pittsburgh (10–1)	Connecticut (10–1)	Kansas (13–3)	Oklahoma (13–3)	Kentucky (16–3)	Texas (15–4)	Kansas (19–5)	Duke (19–4)	Kansas (22–6)	Oklahoma (21–6)	Kansas (25–7)	6.
7.	Florida	Oklahoma (1–0)	Florida (3–0)	Oregon (3–0)	Indiana (6–0)	Oklahoma (5–1)	Illinois (8–0) (1)	Texas (7–2)	Mississippi State (10–1) (2)	Florida (13–2)	Oklahoma (11–3)	Kentucky (15–3)	Oklahoma (15–3)	Pittsburgh (16–3)	Florida (20–4)	Kansas (20–6)	Pittsburgh (21–4)	Florida (24–6)	Duke (24–6)	7.
8.	Alabama	Florida (0–0)	Oklahoma (2–1)	Florida (4–1)	Texas (5–1)	Connecticut (6–0)	Notre Dame (10–1)	Mississippi State (8–1) (1)	Texas (9–2)	Illinois (12–1)	Kentucky (13–3)	Louisville (14–1)	Maryland (14–4)	Duke (16–3)	Duke (17–4)	Pittsburgh (19–4)	Marquette (22–4)	Marquette (23–4)	Wake Forest (24–5)	8.
9.	Michigan State	Michigan State (0–0)	Michigan State (1–0)	Maryland (3–0)	Connecticut (5–0)	Notre Dame (9–1)	Texas (7–2)	Oregon (9–1)	Oklahoma (8–2)	Alabama (11–2)	Louisville (12–1)	Oklahoma State (16–1)	Duke (14–3)	Kansas (17–5)	Pittsburgh (17–4)	Notre Dame (21–5)	Wake Forest (21–4)	Wake Forest (23–4)	Marquette (23–5)	9.
10.	Xavier	Oregon (0–0)	Oregon (1–0)	Indiana (4–0)	Notre Dame (8–1)	Texas (5–2)	Indiana (8–1)	Oklahoma (6–2)	Illinois (10–1)	Notre Dame (13–2)	Creighton (15–1)	Maryland (12–4)	Notre Dame (18–3)	Notre Dame (19–4)	Wake Forest (17–3)	Marquette (20–4)	Duke (20–5)	Xavier (24–4)	Florida (24–7)	10.
11.	Oregon	Xavier (0–0)	Maryland (1–0)	Connecticut (3–0)	Missouri (4–0)	Missouri (6–0)	Oregon (8–1)	Illinois (8–1)	Florida (11–2)	Missouri (10–1)	Connecticut (11–2)	Notre Dame (16–3)	Oklahoma State (17–2)	Marquette (17–3)	Marquette (18–4)	Louisville (19–4)	Xavier (22–4)	Syracuse (23–4)	Illinois (24–6)	11.
12.	Mississippi State (1)	Maryland (0–0)	Connecticut (1–0)	North Carolina (5–0)	Kentucky (4–1)	Illinois (7–0)	Florida (8–2)	Florida (10–2)	Oregon (10–2)	Kansas (11–2)	Maryland (10–4)	Kansas (13–5)	Kansas (15–5)	Creighton (21–2)	Notre Dame (19–5)	Wake Forest (19–4)	Syracuse (21–4)	Duke (21–6)	Xavier (25–5)	12.
13.	Maryland	Mississippi State (0–0) (1)	Marquette (3–0)	Marquette (4–0)	Xavier (4–1)	Florida (7–2)	Marquette (7–1)	Marquette (8–1)	Missouri (8–1)	Creighton (13–1)	Oklahoma State (14–1)	Illinois (14–3)	Creighton (19–2)	Oklahoma State (18–3)	Maryland (15–6)	Xavier (20–4)	Maryland (19–7)	Illinois (21–6)	Syracuse (24–5)	13.
14.	UCLA	Connecticut (0–0)	UCLA (0–0)	Kansas (2–2)	Florida (6–2)	Marquette (6–1)	Kentucky (6–2)	Michigan State (8–2)	Kansas (9–3)	Mississippi State (10–3)	Indiana (13–3)	Connecticut (12–3)	Wake Forest (15–2)	Illinois (16–4)	Xavier (18–4)	Maryland (17–7)	Illinois (20–5)	Maryland (19–8)	Louisville (24–6)	14.
15.	Connecticut	UCLA (0–0)	Kentucky (0–0)	Missouri (2–0)	Illinois (5–0)	Michigan State (5–2)	Michigan State (7–2)	Creighton (10–0)	Indiana (10–2)	Louisville (10–1)	Alabama (12–3)	Georgia (12–4)	Marquette (15–3)	Wake Forest (16–3)	Syracuse (17–4)	Syracuse (19–4)	Louisville (20–5)	Stanford (23–7)	Creighton (29–4)	15.
16.	Georgia	Marquette (1–0)	Xavier (2–1)	Xavier (2–1)	Marquette (5–1)	Mississippi State (6–1)	Mississippi State (7–1)	Missouri (6–1)	Creighton (11–1)	Kentucky (11–3)	Notre Dame (14–3)	Creighton (17–2)	Illinois (15–4)	Maryland (14–6)	Oklahoma State (19–4)	Oklahoma State (20–5)	Notre Dame (21–7)	Memphis (22–5)	Dayton (24–5)	16.
17.	Kentucky	Kentucky (0–0)	Georgia (1–1)	Stanford (4–1)	Tulsa (4–0)	Stanford (5–1)	Missouri (6–1)	Indiana (8–2)	Wake Forest (9–0)	Maryland (9–3)	Wake Forest (12–1)	Wake Forest (13–2)	Georgia (13–5)	Syracuse (16–3)	Creighton (22–3)	Creighton (24–3)	Stanford (22–7)	Notre Dame (22–8)	Maryland (19–9)	17.
18.	Marquette	Georgia (0–1)	Missouri (1–0)	Kentucky (2–1)	Maryland (4–2)	Kentucky (5–2)	Creighton (9–0)	Kansas (7–3)	Kentucky (9–3)	Indiana (11–3)	Illinois (12–3)	Marquette (13–3)	Connecticut (13–4)	Xavier (17–4)	California (18–4)	Illinois (18–5)	Memphis (20–5)	Wisconsin (22–6)	Stanford (23–8)	18.
19.	Missouri	Western Kentucky (0–0)	Indiana (0–0)	Tulsa (3–0)	Stanford (4–1)	Kansas (5–3)	Kansas (6–3)	Xavier (8–2)	Louisville (8–1)	Wake Forest (10–1)	Georgia (10–4)	Indiana (14–4)	Syracuse (14–3)	Mississippi State (15–5)	Mississippi State (16–5)	Stanford (21–6)	Creighton (25–4)	Creighton (28–4)	Memphis (23–6)	19.
20.	Western Kentucky	Missouri (0–0)	Gonzaga (1–0)	Minnesota (2–0)	Kansas (3–3)	Creighton (7–0)	Tulsa (6–1)	Kentucky (6–3)	Georgia (9–3)	Georgia (9–4)	Marquette (12–3)	California (14–2)	Xavier (15–4)	Georgia (13–6)	Illinois (16–5)	Mississippi State (17–6)	Oklahoma State (20–7)	Louisville (21–6)	Mississippi State (21–9)	20.
21.	Indiana	Gonzaga (0–0)	Cincinnati (1–0)	Michigan State (2–2)	Michigan State (4–2)	Xavier (5–2)	Xavier (6–2)	LSU (8–1)	Maryland (7–3)	Marquette (10–3)	Missouri (10–3)	Mississippi State (12–4)	Missouri (13–4)	Missouri (14–5)	Stanford (19–6)	Georgia (16–7)	Dayton (21–5)	Georgia (19–8)	Wisconsin (22–7)	21.
22.	Gonzaga	Indiana (0–0)	Tulsa (2–0)	Virginia (3–1)	North Carolina (5–2)	Tulsa (5–1)	North Carolina (7–2)	Maryland (6–3)	Xavier (9–3)	Oregon (10–4)	Mississippi State (10–4)	Oregon (14–4)	Alabama (13–5)	California (16–4)	Georgia (14–7)	Utah (20–4)	California (20–6)	Dayton (22–5)	Notre Dame (22–9)	22.
23.	Cincinnati	Cincinnati (0–0)	Mississippi State (0–1)	Wisconsin (4–0)	Creighton (6–0)	North Carolina (5–2)	Maryland (4–3)	Wake Forest (7–0)	Texas Tech (9–1)	LSU (11–2)	Oregon (12–4)	Alabama (12–5)	Mississippi State (13–5)	Connecticut (14–5)	Utah (19–4)	California (19–5)	Mississippi State (18–7)	Oklahoma State (21–8)	Connecticut (21–9)	23.
24.	Minnesota	Minnesota (0–0)	Minnesota (1–0)	Mississippi State (2–1)	Mississippi State (5–1)	Maryland (4–3)	LSU (7–1)	Louisville (7–1)	Marquette (8–3)	Oklahoma State (12–1)	Auburn (15–2)	Syracuse (13–2)	Purdue (14–4)	Stanford (17–6)	Purdue (16–6)	Memphis (18–5)	Wisconsin (21–6)	California (20–7)	Missouri (21–10)	24.
25.	Tulsa	Tulsa (0–0)	Wisconsin (3–0)	Illinois (3–0)	Charleston (6–0)	Minnesota (6–1)	Wake Forest (6–0)	Texas Tech (8–1)	Michigan State (8–4)	Syracuse (10–1)	California (12–2)	Missouri (11–4)	Stanford (16–5)	Saint Joseph's (17–3)	Dayton (18–4)	Dayton (19–5)	Georgia (17–8)	Saint Joseph's (22–5)	Georgia (19–8)	25.
	Preseason Pre	Week 2 Nov. 19	Week 3 Nov. 26	Week 4 Dec. 4	Week 5 Dec. 11	Week 6 Dec. 18	Week 7 Dec. 25	Week 8 Jan. 1	Week 9 Jan. 8	Week 10 Jan. 15	Week 11 Jan. 22	Week 12 Jan. 29	Week 13 Feb. 5	Week 14 Feb. 12	Week 15 Feb. 19	Week 16 Feb. 26	Week 17 Mar. 5	Week 18 Mar. 12	Final Mar. 19	
		None	Dropped: Western Kentucky (0–1)	Dropped: UCLA (1–2); Georgia (2–2); Gonzaga (2–2); Cincinnati (2–1)	Dropped: Minnesota (4–1); Virginia (3–2); Wisconsin (5–1)	Dropped: Charleston (7–1)	Dropped: Stanford (6–2); Minnesota (7–2)	Dropped: Tulsa (7–2); North Carolina (8–3)	Dropped: LSU (8–3)	Dropped: Xavier (10–4); Texas Tech (9–3); Michigan State (9–5)	Dropped: LSU (12–3); Syracuse (11–2)	Dropped: Auburn (15–4)	Dropped: Indiana (14–6); California (14–4); Oregon (15–5)	Dropped: Team (0–0)	Dropped: Missouri (15–6); Connecticut (15–6); Saint Joseph's (17–5)	Dropped: Purdue (17–7)	Dropped: Utah (20–6)	Dropped: Mississippi State (19–8)	Dropped: Oklahoma State (21–9); California (20–8); Saint Joseph's (22–6)	

== Coaches Poll ==
	Preseason Nov. 1	Week 3 Nov. 26	Week 4 Dec. 3	Week 5 Dec. 10	Week 6 Dec. 17	Week 7 Dec. 24	Week 8 Dec. 31	Week 9 Jan. 7	Week 10 Jan. 14	Week 11 Jan. 21	Week 12 Jan. 28	Week 13 Feb. 4	Week 14 Feb. 11	Week 15 Feb. 18	Week 16 Feb. 25	Week 17 Mar. 4	Week 18 Mar. 11	Week 19 Mar. 18	Final Apr. 8	
1.	Arizona (27)	Arizona (1–0) (27)	Arizona (2–0) (31)	Arizona (4–0) (31)	Arizona (5–0) (31)	Duke (6–0) (19)	Duke (7–0) (18)	Duke (9–0) (28)	Duke (11–0) (30)	Arizona (13–1) (30)	Arizona (15–1) (31)	Florida (18–2) (16)	Arizona (18–2) (25)	Arizona (20–2) (29)	Arizona (21–2) (29)	Arizona (23–2) (29)	Arizona (25–2) (26)	Kentucky (29–3) (31)	Syracuse (30–5)	1.
2.	Kansas (3)	Kansas (2–0) (4)	Texas (4–0)	Duke (5–0)	Duke (5–0)	Pittsburgh (8–0) (6)	Pittsburgh (9–0) (7)	Arizona (9–1) (2)	Arizona (11–1) (1)	Pittsburgh (14–1) (1)	Pittsburgh (15–1)	Arizona (16–2) (8)	Louisville (18–1) (6)	Kentucky (20–3) (2)	Kentucky (22–3) (2)	Kentucky (24–3) (2)	Kentucky (26–3) (5)	Arizona (25–3)	Kansas (30–8)	2.
3.	Oklahoma (1)	Texas (2–0)	Duke (3–0)	Pittsburgh (5–0)	Pittsburgh (6–0)	Alabama (8–0) (4)	Alabama (9–0) (6)	Connecticut (9–0)	Pittsburgh (12–1)	Duke (12–1)	Texas (13–2)	Texas (14–3) (5)	Kentucky (18–3)	Louisville (19–2)	Oklahoma (19–4)	Florida (24–4)	Texas (22–5)	Oklahoma (24–6)	Texas (26–7)	3.
4.	Pittsburgh	Duke (1–0)	Pittsburgh (3–0)	Alabama (6–0)	Alabama (7–0)	Arizona (5–1) (1)	Arizona (6–1) (1)	Alabama (10–1) (1)	Texas (10–2)	Texas (12–2)	Florida (16–2)	Pittsburgh (15–2) (1)	Oklahoma (16–3)	Texas (17–4)	Florida (22–4)	Texas (20–5)	Kansas (24–6)	Pittsburgh (26–4)	Kentucky (32–4)	4.
5.	Texas	Pittsburgh (1–0)	Alabama (4–0)	Oregon (5–0)	Oregon (6–0)	Oklahoma (6–1)	Connecticut (8–0)	Pittsburgh (10–1)	Oklahoma (10–2)	Florida (15–2)	Duke (13–2)	Oklahoma (15–3)	Florida (19–3)	Oklahoma (17–4)	Duke (19–4)	Oklahoma (20–5)	Pittsburgh (23–4)	Texas (22–6)	Arizona (28–4)	5.
6.	Duke	Alabama (2–0)	Oregon (3–0)	Indiana (6–0)	Indiana (8–0)	Connecticut (7–0) (1)	Notre Dame (10–1)	Notre Dame (12–1)	Connecticut (10–1)	Kansas (13–3)	Oklahoma (13–3)	Louisville (16–1) (1)	Texas (15–4)	Kansas (19–5)	Texas (18–5)	Kansas (22–6)	Oklahoma (21–6)	Kansas (25–7)	Marquette (27–6)	6.
7.	Florida	Florida (3–0)	Oklahoma (3–1)	Texas (5–1)	Oklahoma (5–1)	Illinois (8–0)	Oregon (9–1)	Texas (9–2)	Florida (13–2)	Oklahoma (11–3)	Kentucky (15–3)	Kentucky (16–3)	Pittsburgh (16–3)	Florida (20–4)	Kansas (20–6)	Pittsburgh (21–4)	Florida (24–6)	Duke (24–6)	Oklahoma (27–7)	7.
8.	Alabama	Oklahoma (2–1)	Maryland (3–0)	Oklahoma (4–1)	Connecticut (6–0)	Notre Dame (10–1)	Texas (7–2)	Mississippi State (10–2)	Illinois (12–1)	Connecticut (11–2)	Louisville (14–1)	Maryland (14–4)	Duke (16–3)	Duke (17–4)	Pittsburgh (19–4)	Marquette (22–4)	Marquette (23–4)	Florida (24–7)	Pittsburgh (28–5)	8.
9.	Oregon	Oregon (1–0)	Florida (4–1)	Connecticut (5–0)	Texas (5–2)	Oregon (8–1)	Marquette (8–1)	Oklahoma (8–2)	Notre Dame (13–2)	Creighton (15–1)	Maryland (12–4)	Duke (14–3)	Notre Dame (19–4)	Pittsburgh (17–4)	Louisville (19–4)	Duke (20–5)	Wake Forest (23–4)	Wake Forest (24–5)	Duke (26–7)	9.
10.	Michigan State	Michigan State (1–0)	Marquette (4–0)	Missouri (4–0)	Missouri (6–0)	Texas (7–2)	Mississippi State (8–1)	Oregon (10–2)	Alabama (11–2)	Kentucky (13–3)	Notre Dame (16–3)	Notre Dame (18–3)	Kansas (17–5)	Notre Dame (19–5)	Notre Dame (21–5)	Wake Forest (21–4)	Xavier (24–4)	Illinois (24–6)	Maryland (21–10)	10.
11.	Xavier	Maryland (1–0)	Indiana (5–0)	Xavier (4–1)	Notre Dame (9–1)	Indiana (8–1)	Oklahoma (6–2)	Illinois (10–1)	Missouri (10–1)	Maryland (10–4)	Oklahoma State (16–1)	Kansas (15–5)	Marquette (17–3)	Wake Forest (17–3)	Marquette (20–4)	Xavier (22–4)	Syracuse (23–4)	Marquette (23–5)	Connecticut (23–10)	11.
12.	UCLA	Connecticut (1–0)	Connecticut (3–0)	Kentucky (4–1)	Illinois (7–0)	Marquette (7–1)	Illinois (8–1)	Florida (11–2)	Kansas (11–3)	Notre Dame (14–3)	Connecticut (12–3)	Oklahoma State (17–2)	Creighton (21–2)	Marquette (18–4)	Wake Forest (19–4)	Syracuse (21–4) т	Duke (21–6)	Syracuse (24–5)	Wake Forest (25–6)	12.
13.	Mississippi State	Marquette (3–0)	Kansas (2–2)	Marquette (5–1)	Florida (7–2)	Florida (8–2)	Florida (10–2)	Missouri (8–1)	Mississippi State (10–3)	Alabama (12–3)	Kansas (13–5)	Creighton (19–2)	Illinois (16–4)	Maryland (15–6)	Xavier (20–4)	Maryland (19–7) т	Illinois (21–6)	Louisville (24–6)	Illinois (25–7) т	13.
14.	Connecticut	UCLA (0–0)	North Carolina (5–0)	Illinois (5–0)	Marquette (6–1)	Kentucky (6–2)	Michigan State (8–2)	Kansas (9–3)	Creighton (13–1)	Louisville (12–1)	Illinois (14–3)	Marquette (15–3)	Oklahoma State (18–3)	Xavier (18–4)	Maryland (17–7)	Illinois (20–5)	Stanford (23–7)	Xavier (25–5)	Wisconsin (24–8) т	14.
15.	Maryland	Xavier (2–1)	Missouri (2–0)	Notre Dame (8–1)	Michigan State (5–2)	Michigan State (7–2)	Creighton (10–0)	Indiana (10–2)	Maryland (9–3)	Illinois (12–3)	Creighton (17–2)	Wake Forest (15–2)	Maryland (14–6)	Illinois (16–5)	Syracuse (19–4)	Louisville (20–5)	Maryland (19–8)	Creighton (29–4)	Notre Dame (24–10)	15.
16.	Georgia	Kentucky (0–0)	Xavier (2–1)	Maryland (4–2)	Kentucky (5–2)	Missouri (6–1)	Missouri (6–1)	Creighton (11–1)	Kentucky (11–3)	Indiana (13–3)	Marquette (13–3)	Illinois (15–4)	Xavier (17–4)	Oklahoma State (19–4)	Illinois (18–5)	Notre Dame (21–7)	Louisville (21–6)	Stanford (23–8)	Florida (25–8)	16.
17.	Kentucky	Missouri (1–0)	Minnesota (2–0)	Florida (6–2)	Mississippi State (6–1)	Mississippi State (7–1)	Kansas (7–3)	Maryland (7–3)	Indiana (11–3)	Oklahoma State (14–1)	Georgia (12–4)	Connecticut (13–4)	Wake Forest (16–3)	Syracuse (17–4)	Oklahoma State (20–5)	Stanford (22–7)	Creighton (28–4)	Maryland (19–9)	Xavier (26–6)	17.
18.	Missouri	Georgia (1–1)	Kentucky (2–1)	Tulsa (4–0)	Kansas (5–3)	Creighton (9–0)	Indiana (8–2)	Wake Forest (9–0)	Louisville (10–1)	Wake Forest (12–1)	Wake Forest (13–2)	Georgia (13–5)	Syracuse (16–3)	Creighton (22–3)	Creighton (24–3)	Oklahoma State (20–7)	Wisconsin (22–6)	Dayton (25–5)	Michigan State (22–13)	18.
19.	Marquette	Cincinnati (1–0)	Tulsa (3–0)	Kansas (3–3)	Creighton (6–0)	Kansas (6–3)	Xavier (8–2)	Kentucky (9–3)	Oregon (10–4)	Marquette (12–3)	Oregon (14–4)	Xavier (15–4)	Connecticut (14–5)	Mississippi State (16–5)	Stanford (21–6)	Creighton (25–4)	Notre Dame (22–8)	Wisconsin (22–7)	Louisville (25–7)	19.
20.	Cincinnati	Indiana (0–0)	Illinois (3–0)	Stanford (4–1)	Xavier (5–2)	Xavier (6–2)	Maryland (6–3)	Michigan State (8–4)	Wake Forest (10–1)	Missouri (10–3)	Indiana (14–4)	Alabama (13–5)	Mississippi State (15–5)	California (18–4)	Mississippi State (17–6)	California (20–6)	Oklahoma State (21–8)	Notre Dame (22–9)	Stanford (24–9)	20.
21.	Indiana	Gonzaga (1–0)	Michigan State (2–2)	Michigan State (4–2)	Stanford (5–1)	Tulsa (6–1)	Kentucky (6–3)	Texas Tech (9–1)	Marquette (10–3)	Oregon (12–4)	Alabama (12–5)	Syracuse (14–3)	Missouri (14–5)	Stanford (19–6)	California (19–5)	Mississippi State (18–7)	Dayton (22–5)	Mississippi State (21–9)	Butler (27–6)	21.
22.	Gonzaga	Minnesota (1–0)	Stanford (4–1)	Mississippi State (5–1) т	Tulsa (5–1)	Maryland (4–3)	Texas Tech (8–1)	Xavier (9–3)	Georgia (9–4)	Georgia (10–4)	Mississippi State (12–4)	Missouri (13–4)	Georgia (13–6)	Missouri (15–6)	Georgia (16–7)	Dayton (21–5)	Georgia (19–8)	Memphis (23–6)	Missouri (22–11)	22.
23.	Western Kentucky	Mississippi State (0–1)	Virginia (3–2)	North Carolina (5–2) т	Maryland (4–3)	North Carolina (7–2)	Wake Forest (7–0)	Marquette (8–3)	Xavier (10–4)	Mississippi State (10–4)	Xavier (14–4)	Oregon (15–5)	California (16–4)	Purdue (16–6)	Utah (20–4)	Utah (21–5)	California (20–7)	Oklahoma State (21–9)	Creighton (29–5)	23.
24.	Minnesota	Tulsa (2–0)	Mississippi State (2–1)	Creighton (6–0)	North Carolina (5–2)	NC State (6–1)	NC State (7–1)	Georgia (9–3)	Oklahoma State (12–1)	Xavier (12–4)	California (14–2)	Mississippi State (13–5)	Stanford (17–6)	Connecticut (15–6) т	Connecticut (17–6)	Wisconsin (21–6)	Memphis (22–5)	Connecticut (21–9)	Oklahoma State (22–10)	24.
25.	Illinois	Illinois (1–0)	Gonzaga (2–2)	Minnesota (4–1)	NC State (5–0)	Texas Tech (7–1)	LSU (8–1)	Louisville (8–1)	Texas Tech (10–2)	Texas Tech (11–2)	Missouri (11–4)	Purdue (14–4)	Purdue (15–5)	Georgia (14–7) т	Dayton (19–5)	Georgia (17–8)		Missouri (21–10)	Dayton (25–6)	25.
	Preseason Nov. 1	Week 3 Nov. 26	Week 4 Dec. 3	Week 5 Dec. 10	Week 6 Dec. 17	Week 7 Dec. 24	Week 8 Dec. 31	Week 9 Jan. 7	Week 10 Jan. 14	Week 11 Jan. 21	Week 12 Jan. 28	Week 13 Feb. 4	Week 14 Feb. 11	Week 15 Feb. 18	Week 16 Feb. 25	Week 17 Mar. 4	Week 18 Mar. 11	Week 19 Mar. 18	Final Apr. 8	
		Dropped: Western Kentucky (0–1)	Dropped: UCLA (1–1); Georgia (1–3); Cincinnati (3–1)	Dropped: Virginia (3–2); Gonzaga (5–2)	Dropped: Minnesota (6–1)	Dropped: Stanford (7–3)	Dropped: Tulsa (7–2); North Carolina (8–3)	Dropped: NC State (8–2); LSU (9–2)	Dropped: Michigan State (9–5)	None	Dropped: Texas Tech (11–4)	Dropped: Indiana (14–6); California (14–4)	Dropped: Alabama (13–7); Oregon (16–6)	None	Dropped: Missouri (16–7); Purdue (16–8)	Dropped: Connecticut (18–7)	Dropped: Utah (23–6)	Dropped: Georgia (19–8); California (21–8)	Dropped: Memphis (23–7); Mississippi State (21–10)	
