= 2002–03 Atlantic 10 Conference men's basketball season =

- League: NCAA Division I
- Sport: Basketball
- Duration: January 2002 through March 2003
- Teams: 12

Regular Season

Tournament

Basketball seasons
- ← 03–04 01–02 →

2002–03 Atlantic 10 men's basketball standings
	Conf.				Overall
Team	W		L	PCT	W		L	PCT
East
Saint Joseph's	12	–	4	.750	23	–	7	.767
Rhode Island	10	–	6	.625	19	–	12	.613
Temple	10	–	6	.625	18	–	16	.529
UMass	6	–	10	.375	11	–	18	.379
Fordham	3	–	13	.188	2	–	26	.071
St. Bonaventure	1	–	15	.063	13	–	14	.481
West
No. 12 Xavier	15	–	1	.938	26	–	6	.813
No. 16 Dayton †	14	–	2	.875	24	–	6	.800
Richmond	10	–	6	.625	15	–	14	.517
La Salle	6	–	10	.375	12	–	17	.414
George Washington	5	–	11	.313	12	–	17	.414
Duquesne	4	–	13	.235	9	–	21	.300
† Atlantic 10 Tournament winner As of February 5, 2016; Rankings from Coaches' Poll

The 2002–03 Atlantic 10 Conference men's basketball season marked the 27th season of Atlantic 10 Conference basketball.

== Atlantic 10 Preseason Poll ==
Rank	Team
1	
2	
3	
4	
5	
6	
7	
8	
9	
10	
11	
12	

First-place votes in parentheses

== Preseason All-A10 Team ==
First Team

Second Team

Third Team

== Postseason ==
=== Atlantic 10 Tournament ===
All the games were held at University of Dayton Arena in Dayton, Ohio.

== Post Tournament Results ==
=== NCAA tournament ===
- Dayton Wildcats (0-1): Eliminated by Tulsa in the first round
- Xavier Musketeers (1-1): Eliminated by Maryland in the second round
- Saint Joseph's Hawks (0-1): Eliminated by Auburn in the first round

=== National Invitation Tournament ===
- Rhode Island Rams (1-1): Eliminated by Temple in the second round
- Richmond Spiders (0-1): Eliminated by Providence in the opening round
- Temple Owls (3-1): Eliminated by Minnesota in the quarterfinals
