= Dereck Whittenburg =

American basketball player and coach (born 1960)

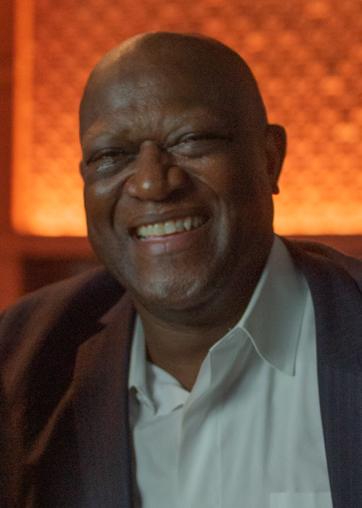
- Whittenburg in 2024

Current position
- Title: Associate athletic director
- Team: NC State
- Conference: ACC

Biographical details
- Born: October 2, 1960 (age 66); Glenarden, Maryland, U.S.

Playing career
- 1979–1983: NC State
- Position: Guard

Coaching career (HC unless noted)
- 1985–1986: NC State (assistant)
- 1986–1987: George Mason (assistant)
- 1987–1988: Long Beach State (assistant)
- 1988–1991: NC State (assistant)
- 1991–1993: Colorado (assistant)
- 1993–1994: West Virginia (assistant)
- 1994–1999: Georgia Tech (assistant)
- 1999–2003: Wagner
- 2003–2009: Fordham
- 2013–2015: NC State (assistant)

Administrative career (AD unless noted)
- 2015–present: NC State (associate AD)

Head coaching record
- Overall: 135–162
- Tournaments: 0–1 (NCAA Division I); 0–1 (NIT)

Accomplishments and honors

Championships
- NEC regular season (2003); NEC tournament (2003)

Awards
- NEC Coach of the Year (2003); No. 25 jersey honored by NC State Wolfpack; McDonald's All-American (1979)

Dereck Whittenburg (born October 2, 1960) is an American basketball coach and former collegiate basketball player who played for North Carolina State University, where he was a member of the 1982–83 team that won the 1983 NCAA National Championship. He is currently employed by the athletic department at his alma mater, with his official title being Associate Athletic Director for Community Relations and Student Support.

Whittenburg has also been an assistant coach on several teams including North Carolina State, for whom he served three separate stints under head coaches Jim Valvano, Les Robinson, and Mark Gottfried. He also served as head coach at Wagner College and Fordham University.

== Biography ==
Whittenburg was a high school All-American for Morgan Wootten at DeMatha Catholic High School in Hyattsville, Maryland. He was paired with Sidney Lowe as a backcourt combination and together the pair helped lead DeMatha to a national championship his junior year. In Whittenburg's four years at DeMatha, the team DeMatha only lost twelve times.

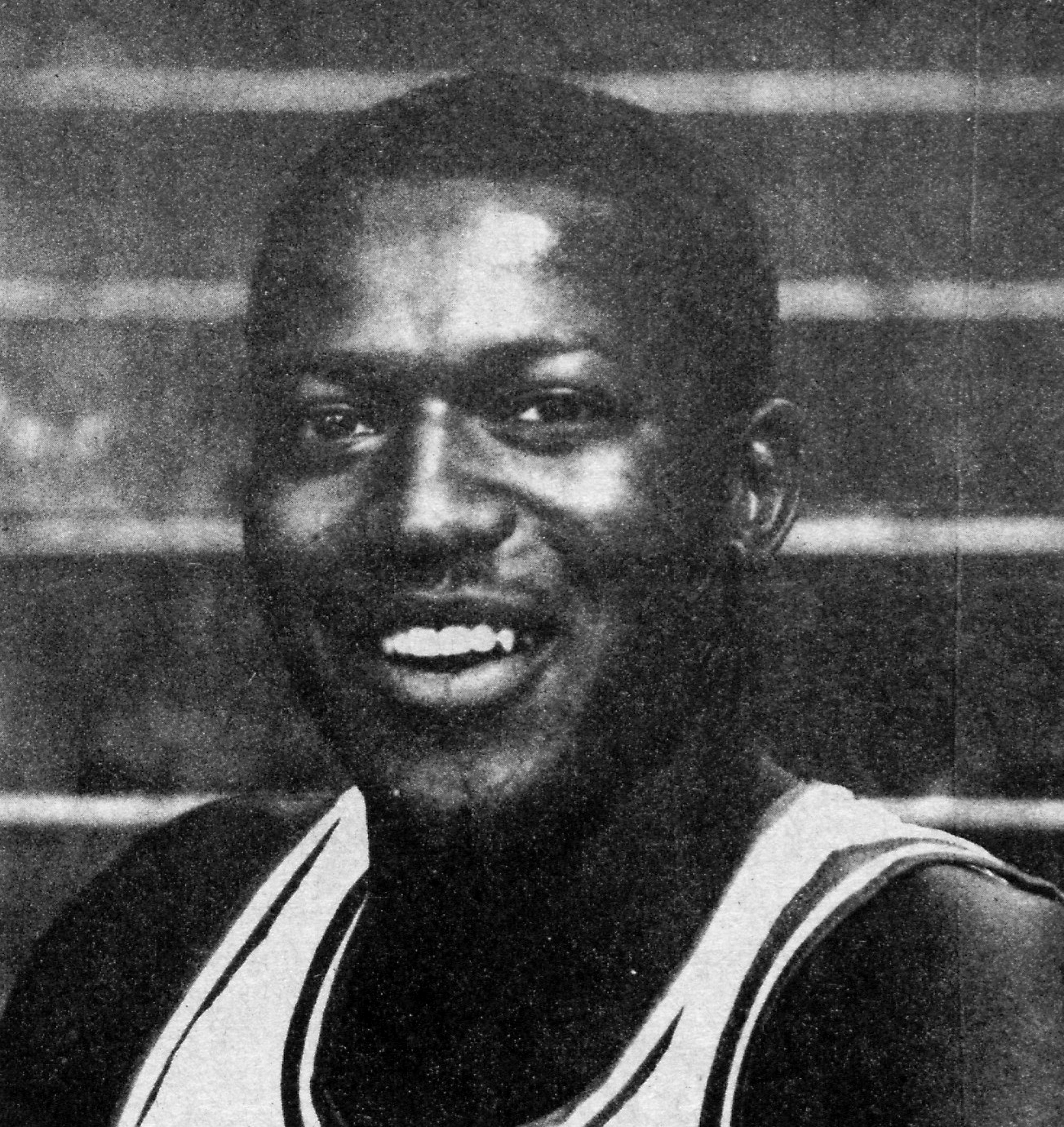
Whittenburg c. 1983

Whittenburg's cousin was NBA star David Thompson, who had won the national championship while playing for the North Carolina State Wolfpack in 1974. He sought to emulate his cousin and play for Norm Sloan at NC State, where he thought he would win a national championship. Once he and Lowe graduated from DeMatha in 1979, both players signed with the Wolfpack. Whittenburg became a star player under Sloan's successor, Jim Valvano, as he was named second team all-Atlantic Coast Conference as a junior and helped the Wolfpack to the 1983 national championship. He was a third-round draft choice for the Phoenix Suns (51st overall) in the 1983 NBA draft.

In 1985, Whittenburg became an assistant coach at NC State under Valvano. After a year there he moved on to George Mason University. Whittenburg then followed his head coach from George Mason, Joe Harrington, to Long Beach State, but only stayed there a year before returning to Valvano's staff at his alma mater. After Valvano's forced resignation in 1990, Whittenburg remained at NC State for one more year before rejoining Harrington at Colorado. He returned east in 1993 to join Gale Catlett's West Virginia squad for a year, then returned to the ACC with Bobby Cremins and Georgia Tech.

After five years at Georgia Tech, Whittenburg got a chance to become a head coach when he was hired by Wagner in 1999. He led the Seahawks to three winning campaigns in four years, including a berth in the 2002 National Invitation Tournament and a Northeast Conference championship and automatic bid to the NCAA tournament in 2003. His success gained the attention of Fordham University, who hired Whittenburg away from Wagner to replace former NBA head coach Bob Hill. He struggled as the Rams' head coach, only posting one winning season in six full seasons there. Whittenburg's last full season saw Fordham lose 25 out of 28 games, one of the worst records in all of college basketball, and with the team starting out the 2009–10 season with one win in their first five games Whittenburg was fired.

After spending some time working in television, Whittenburg returned to coaching in 2013 when he was hired to be the senior assistant to the head coach at NC State. He also worked as the director of player development.

On October 23, 2015, NC State announced that Whittenburg had accepted the position of Associate Athletic Director for Community Relations and Student Support, and would no longer be serving as an assistant coach, effective immediately.

Whittenburg was an executive producer for "Survive and Advance", a 30 for 30 documentary detailing NC State's 1983 title run. He was also an executive producer for "The Gospel According to Mac", a 30 for 30 documentary about Colorado football coach Bill McCartney.

== Head coaching record ==
Record table
| Season | Team | Overall | Conference | Standing | Postseason |
|---|---|---|---|---|---|
Wagner Seahawks (Northeast Conference) (1999–2003)
| 1999–00 | Wagner | 11–16 | 6–12 | 10th | |
| 2000–01 | Wagner | 16–13 | 11–9 | T–5th | |
| 2001–02 | Wagner | 19–10 | 15–5 | T–2nd | NIT Opening Round |
| 2002–03 | Wagner | 21–11 | 14–4 | 1st | NCAA Division I First Round |
| Wagner: | | 67–50 | 46–30 | | |
Fordham Rams (Atlantic 10 Conference) (2003–2009)
| 2003–04 | Fordham | 6–22 | 3–13 | T–5th (East) | |
| 2004–05 | Fordham | 13–16 | 8–8 | 4th (East) | |
| 2005–06 | Fordham | 16–16 | 9–7 | T–5th | |
| 2006–07 | Fordham | 18–12 | 10–6 | T–4th | |
| 2007–08 | Fordham | 12–17 | 6–10 | 12th | |
| 2008–09 | Fordham | 3–25 | 1–15 | 14th | |
| 2009–10 | Fordham | 1–4 | 0–0 | | |
| Fordham: | | 69–112 | 37–59 | | |
| Total: | | 136–162 | | | |
National champion Postseason invitational champion Conference regular season champion Conference regular season and conference tournament champion Division regular season champion Division regular season and conference tournament champion Conference tournament champion
