= Ed DeChellis =

American basketball coach (born 1958)

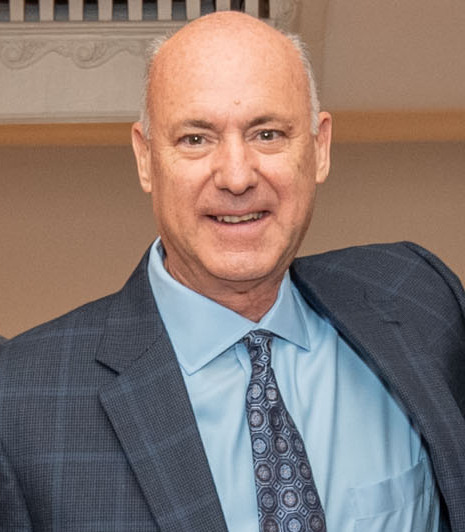
- DeChellis in 2023

Biographical details
- Born: November 14, 1958 (age 67); Monaca, Pennsylvania, U.S.
- Education: Penn State ('82)

Coaching career (HC unless noted)
- 1982–1984: Penn State (assistant)
- 1984–1986: Salem International (assistant)
- 1986–1996: Penn State (assistant)
- 1996–2003: East Tennessee State
- 2003–2011: Penn State
- 2011–2025: Navy

Head coaching record
- Overall: 415–461 (.474)
- Tournaments: 0–2 (NCAA Division I); 5–1 (NIT)

Accomplishments and honors

Championships
- NIT (2009); 2 SoCon regular season (2001, 2002); SoCon tournament (2003)

Awards
- SoCon Coach of the Year (2001); Big Ten Coach of the Year (2009); 2× Patriot League Coach of the Year (2021, 2022)

Edward Richard DeChellis (born November 14, 1958) is an American former college basketball coach. He most recently was the head men's basketball coach at the United States Naval Academy from 2011 to 2025. Previously he was the head coach at Penn State from 2003 to 2011 and at East Tennessee State from 1996 to 2003. At Penn State, DeChellis led the Nittany Lions to an NIT title in 2009 and an NCAA tournament berth in 2011. DeChellis' years at East Tennessee State yielded three conference division titles and one NCAA tournament berth. He was named the head coach at Navy in 2011, following the departure of Billy Lange.

DeChellis received the 2009 Big Ten Coach of the Year award and 2006 National Coaches vs. Cancer Man of the Year. He was born in the Pittsburgh, Pennsylvania suburb of Monaca and has three daughters with his wife Kim.

== Coaching ==
DeChellis was the head coach of the East Tennessee State University men's basketball program from 1996 to 2003, winning three Southern Conference north division titles (2000–03). Prior to joining East Tennessee State, DeChellis served as an assistant coach at Salem College (WV) and Penn State University.

In 2003, DeChellis inherited a Penn State team that had gone 7–21 the previous two seasons. In his first two seasons, Penn State won only 9 and 7 games, respectively, before finishing 15–15 in 2005–06. During this time, DeChellis recruited Geary Claxton and Jamelle Cornley to PSU.

Despite DeChellis' widely critiqued decision to release promising sophomore Milos Bogetic from his scholarship, the 2007–08 Nittany Lions entertained hopes of being a dark-horse contender in the Big Ten Conference and possibly even winning enough games to get into the NCAA tournament. Those hopes were quickly disintegrated when senior forward Geary Claxton went down with an anterior cruciate ligament injury in January. The Lions were plagued with more injuries, when junior forward Jamelle Cornley battled a bruised knee all season. The Lions went 15–16 in the 2007–08 season in a team that started four freshman in the end. Highlights included upset wins over top-10-ranked Michigan State and top-20-ranked Indiana.

DeChellis led the Lions to a 21–10 regular season in 2008–09, equaling the Penn State record for regular-season wins. The Nittany Lions were 10–8 in the Big Ten, the most for Penn State since 1995–96. DeChellis was named Big Ten Coach of the Year. The Nittany Lions went on to win the 2009 National Invitation Tournament (NIT), the first national tournament title in Penn State men's basketball history.

In the 2010–11 season, DeChellis' Nittany Lions earned a spot in the NCAA tournament, the school's first since 2000–01. The 10th-seeded Lions fell in the opening round to the 7th-seeded Temple Owls.

On May 23, 2011, it was announced that DeChellis would leave Penn State to become the head coach at Navy. He announced his retirement on March 19, 2025, after fourteen years with the Midshipmen. He ended his tenure at Navy with a school-record 426 games coached which included 196 wins.

DeChellis holds a bachelor's degree from Penn State University.

== Head coaching record ==
Record table
Season	Team	Overall	Conference	Standing	Postseason
East Tennessee State Buccaneers (Southern Conference) (1996–2003)
1996–97	East Tennessee State	7–20	2–12	5th (North)	
1997–98	East Tennessee State	11–16	6–9	T–4th (North)	
1998–99	East Tennessee State	17–11	9–7	T–3rd (North)	
1999–00	East Tennessee State	14–15	8–8	4th (North)	
2000–01	East Tennessee State	18–10	13–3	1st (North)	
2001–02	East Tennessee State	18–10	11–5	T–1st (North)	
2002–03	East Tennessee State	20–11	11–5	T–1st (North)	NCAA Division I First Round
East Tennessee State:		105–93 (.530)	60–49 (.550)		
Penn State Nittany Lions (Big Ten Conference) (2003–2011)
2003–04	Penn State	9–19	3–13	T–10th	
2004–05	Penn State	7–23	1–15	11th	
2005–06	Penn State	15–15	6–10	T–8th	NIT Opening Round
2006–07	Penn State	11–19	2–14	T–10th	
2007–08	Penn State	15–16	7–11	7th	
2008–09	Penn State	27–11	10–8	T–4th	NIT champion
2009–10	Penn State	11–20	3–15	11th	
2010–11	Penn State	19–15	9–9	T–4th	NCAA Division I First Round
Penn State:		114–138 (.452)	41–95 (.301)		
Navy Midshipmen (Patriot League) (2011–2025)
2011–12	Navy	3–26	0–14	8th	
2012–13	Navy	8–23	2–12	8th	
2013–14	Navy	9–21	4–14	10th	
2014–15	Navy	13–19	8–10	T–6th	
2015–16	Navy	19–14	9–9	T–4th	
2016–17	Navy	16–16	10–8	4th	
2017–18	Navy	20–12	11–7	T–3rd	
2018–19	Navy	12–19	8–10	T–5th	
2019–20	Navy	14–16	8–10	T–6th	
2020–21	Navy	15–3	12–1	1st (South)	
2021–22	Navy	21–11	12–6	2nd	
2022–23	Navy	18–13	11–7	T–2nd	
2023–24	Navy	13–18	8–10	T–8th	
2024–25	Navy	15–19	10–8	T–3rd	
Navy:		196–230 (.460)	113–126 (.473)		
Total:		415–461 (.474)			
National champion Postseason invitational champion Conference regular season champion Conference regular season and conference tournament champion Division regular season champion Division regular season and conference tournament champion Conference tournament champion
