= 2002–03 Wagner Seahawks men's basketball team =

American college basketball season

2002–03 Wagner Seahawks men's basketball
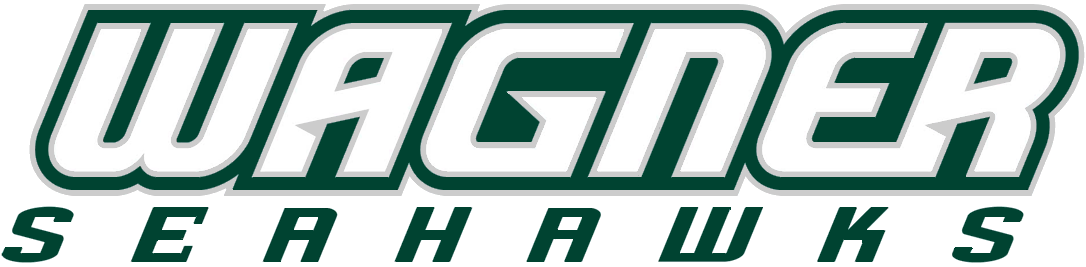

NEC regular season and tournament champions

NCAA tournament, First round
- Conference: Northeast Conference
- Record: 21–11 (14–4 NEC)
- Head coach: Dereck Whittenburg (4th season)
- Assistant coach: Martin Ingelsby (1st season)
- Home arena: Spiro Sports Center

2002–03 Northeast Conference men's basketball standings
	Conf.				Overall
Team	W		L	PCT	W		L	PCT
Wagner †	14	–	4	.778	21	–	11	.656
Monmouth	13	–	5	.722	15	–	13	.536
Central Connecticut	12	–	6	.667	15	–	13	.536
Quinnipiac	10	–	8	.556	17	–	12	.586
Saint Francis (PA)	10	–	8	.556	14	–	14	.500
St. Francis (NY)	9	–	9	.500	14	–	16	.467
Fairleigh Dickinson	9	–	9	.500	15	–	14	.517
Long Island	7	–	11	.389	9	–	19	.321
Robert Morris	7	–	11	.389	10	–	17	.370
Mount St. Mary's	6	–	12	.333	11	–	16	.407
Sacred Heart	6	–	12	.333	8	–	21	.276
UMBC	5	–	13	.278	7	–	20	.259
† 2003 NEC tournament winner

The 2002–03 Wagner Seahawks men's basketball team represented Wagner College during the 2002–03 NCAA Division I men's basketball season. The Seahawks are led by fourth-year head coach Dereck Whittenburg. They played their home games at Spiro Sports Center on the school's Staten Island campus as members of the Northeast Conference. Wagner finished on top of the NEC regular season standings, won the NEC tournament, and received an automatic bid to the NCAA tournament. Making the program's first appearance in the "Big Dance," and playing as the No. 15 seed in the East region, the Seahawks were beaten by No. 2 seed Pittsburgh in the opening round.

== Roster ==
2002–03 Wagner Seahawks men's basketball team
Players	Coaches
Pos. / # / Name / Height / Weight / Year / Previous school / Hometown; F / / Jermaine Hall / 6 ft 5 in (1.96 m) / 220 lb (100 kg) / Sr / Dublin / Dublin, GA	Head coach: Dereck Whittenburg (NC State); Assistant coach(es): Martin Ingelsby (Notre Dame); Legend: (C) Team captain; (S) Suspended; (I) Ineligible; (W) Walk-on; Injured; Current redshirt; Roster; Last update: December 29, 2020

== Schedule and results ==
Date time, TV	Rank^{#}	Opponent^{#}	Result	Record	Site (attendance) city, state
Regular season
Nov 19, 2002*		at UNC Greensboro	L 65–84	0–1	Fleming Gymnasium (2,067); Greensboro, North Carolina
Nov 26, 2002*		Brown	W 81–69	1–1	Spiro Sports Center (1,238); Staten Island, New York
Nov 30, 2002*		at VCU	W 80–72	2–1	Siegel Center (2,111); Richmond, Virginia
Dec 3, 2002*		at Iona	L 81–87	2–2	John A. Mulcahy Campus Events Center (1,810); New Rochelle, New York
Dec 7, 2002*		at No. 11 Connecticut	L 85–97	2–3	Harry A. Gampel Pavilion (10,167); Storrs, Connecticut
Dec 14, 2002*		at Delaware State	L 63–70	2–4	Memorial Hall (847); Dover, Delaware
Dec 21, 2002*		at Georgia Southern	L 81–90	2–5	Hanner Fieldhouse (1,160); Statesboro, Georgia
Dec 30, 2002*		American	W 69–55	3–5	Spiro Sports Center (1,461); Staten Island, New York
Jan 2, 2003*		Lehigh	W 80–68	4–5	Spiro Sports Center (1,014); Staten Island, New York
Jan 4, 2003*		at No. 22 Maryland	L 57–79	4–6	Comcast Center (17,505); College Park, Maryland
Jan 8, 2003		at Sacred Heart	W 74–63	5–6 (1–0)	William H. Pitt Center (384); Fairfield, Connecticut
Jan 11, 2003		at Central Connecticut State	W 76–67	6–6 (2–0)	Detrick Gymnasium (1,518); New Britain, Connecticut
Jan 13, 2003		Quinnipiac	W 91–69	7–6 (3–0)	Spiro Sports Center (1,513); Staten Island, New York
Jan 16, 2003		Fairleigh Dickinson	L 79–83	7–7 (3–1)	Spiro Sports Center (1,983); Staten Island, New York
Jan 20, 2003		at Monmouth	W 63–45	8–7 (4–1)	William T. Boylan Gymnasium (2,189); West Long Branch, New Jersey
Jan 25, 2003		at Robert Morris	W 101–80	9–7 (5–1)	Charles L. Sewall Center (1,124); Moon Township, Pennsylvania
Jan 27, 2003		at Saint Francis (PA)	W 84–72	10–7 (6–1)	Maurice Stokes Athletic Center (865); Loretto, Pennsylvania
Feb 1, 2003		Robert Morris	W 77–72	11–7 (7–1)	Spiro Sports Center (2,011); Staten Island, New York
Feb 3, 2003		Saint Francis (PA)	W 102–89	12–7 (8–1)	Spiro Sports Center (1,343); Staten Island, New York
Feb 6, 2003		at Fairleigh Dickinson	L 62–68	12–8 (8–2)	Rothman Center (861); Hackensack, New Jersey
Feb 8, 2003		Monmouth	W 62–53	13–8 (9–2)	Spiro Sports Center (2,072); Staten Island, New York
Feb 10, 2003		at Quinnipiac	W 74–70	14–8 (10–2)	Burt Kahn Court (1,403); Hamden, Connecticut
Feb 18, 2003		Central Connecticut State	W 61–58	15–8 (11–2)	Spiro Sports Center (1,471); Staten Island, New York
Feb 20, 2003		Mount St. Mary's	W 57–55	16–8 (12–2)	Spiro Sports Center (1,322); Staten Island, New York
Feb 22, 2003		UMBC	W 76–65	17–8 (13–2)	Spiro Sports Center (2,124); Staten Island, New York
Feb 24, 2003		Sacred Heart	W 79–71	18–8 (14–2)	Spiro Sports Center (1,390); Staten Island, New York
Feb 27, 2003		at Long Island University	L 71–87	18–9 (14–3)	Schwartz Athletic Center (615); Brooklyn, New York
Mar 1, 2003		at St. Francis (NY)	L 84–96	18–10 (14–4)	Generoso Pope Athletic Complex (861); Brooklyn, New York
NEC tournament
Mar 8, 2003*	(1)	(8) Long Island University; Quarterfinals	W 88–66	19–10	Spiro Sports Center (1,254); Staten Island, New York
Mar 9, 2003*	(1)	(4) Quinnipiac; Semifinals	W 61–54	20–10	Spiro Sports Center (2,625); Staten Island, New York
Mar 12, 2003*	(1)	(6) St. Francis (NY); Championship	W 78–61	21–10	Spiro Sports Center (2,327); Staten Island, New York
NCAA tournament
Mar 21, 2003*	(15 MW)	vs. (2 MW) No. 4 Pittsburgh; First round	L 61–87	21–11	FleetCenter (17,962); Boston, Massachusetts
*Non-conference game. ^{#}Rankings from AP Poll. (#) Tournament seedings in parentheses. MW=Midwest. All times are in Eastern.
