= List of Atlantic 10 Conference men's basketball seasons =

The Atlantic 10 men's basketball tournament, an American college competition in men's basketball, has been held every year since 1977.

== List ==
Year	Top seed	Record	Eastern champion	Western champion	Tournament champion	No. of teams	Notes
Regular season					Tournament champion	No. of teams	Notes
1976–77	Rutgers	7–1	Rutgers	West Virginia; Penn State	Duquesne	8	
1977–78	Rutgers	7–3	Rutgers; Villanova		Villanova	8	
1978–79	Villanova	9–1	Villanova		Rutgers	8	
1979–80	Villanova	7–3	Duquesne; Rutgers; Villanova		Villanova	8	
1980–81	Rhode Island	10–3	Duquesne; Rhode Island		Pittsburgh	8	
1981–82	West Virginia	13–1	West Virginia		Pittsburgh	8	
1982–83	Rutgers	11–3	Rutgers	St. Bonaventure; West Virginia	West Virginia	10	
1983–84	Temple	18–0	Temple		West Virginia	10	
1984–85	West Virginia	16–2	West Virginia		Temple	10	
1985–86	Saint Joseph's	16–2	Saint Joseph's		Saint Joseph's	10	
1986–87	Temple	17–1	Temple		Temple	10	
1987–88	Temple	18–0	Temple		Temple	10	
1988–89	West Virginia	17–1	West Virginia		Rutgers	10	
1989–90	Temple	15–3	Temple		Temple	10	
1990–91	Rutgers	14–4	Rutgers		Penn State	10	
1991–92	Massachusetts	13–3	Massachusetts		UMass	9	
1992–93	Massachusetts	11–3	Massachusetts		UMass	8	
1993–94	Massachusetts	14–2	Massachusetts		UMass	9	
1994–95	Massachusetts	13–3	Massachusetts		UMass	9	
1995–96	Massachusetts; Virginia Tech	15–1; 13–3	Massachusetts	George Washginton; Virginia Tech	UMass	12	
1996–97	Saint Joseph's; Xavier	13–3	Saint Joseph's	Xavier	Saint Joseph's	12	
1997–98	Temple; Xavier	13–3; 11–5	Temple	Dayton; George Washington; Xavier	Xavier	12	
1998–99	Temple; George Washington	13–3	Temple	George Washington	Rhode Island	12	
1999–00	Temple; Dayton	14–2; 11–5	Temple	Dayton	Temple	12	
2000–01	Saint Joseph's	14–2	Saint Joseph's		Temple	11	
2001–02	Temple; Xavier	12–4; 14–2	Saint Joseph's; Temple	Xavier	Xavier	12	
2002–03	Saint Joseph's; Xavier	12–4; 15–1	Saint Joseph's	Xavier	Dayton	12	
2003–04	Saint Joseph's; Dayton	16–0; 12–4	Saint Joseph's	Dayton	Xavier	12	
2004–05	Saint Joseph's; George Washington	14–2; 11–5	Saint Joseph's	George Washington	George Washington	12	
2005–06	George Washington	16–0	George Washington		Xavier	14	
2006–07	Xavier	13–3	Massachusetts; Xavier		George Washington	14	
2007–08	Xavier	14–2	Xavier		Temple	14	
2008–09	Xavier	12–4	Xavier		Temple	14	
2009–10	Temple	14–2	Temple; Xavier		Temple	14	
2010–11	Xavier	15–1	Xavier		Richmond	14	
2011–12	Temple	13–3	Temple		St. Bonaventure	14	
2012–13	Saint Louis	13–3	Saint Louis		Saint Louis	16	
2013–14	Saint Louis	13–3	Saint Louis		Saint Joseph's	13	
2014–15	Davidson	14–4	Davidson		VCU	14	
2015–16	Dayton	14–4	Dayton, VCU, St. Bonaventure		Saint Joseph's	14	
2016–17	Dayton	15–3	Dayton		Rhode Island	14	
2017–18	Rhode Island	15–3	Rhode Island		Davidson	14	
2018–19	VCU	16–2	VCU		Saint Louis	14	
2019–20	Dayton	18–0	VCU		Cancelled due to the pandemic	14	
2020–21	St. Bonaventure	11–4	St. Bonaventure		St. Bonaventure	14	
2021–22	Davidson	15–3	Davidson		Richmond	14	
2022–23	VCU	15–3	VCU		VCU	15	
2023–24	Richmond	15–3	Richmond, Loyola Chicago		Duquesne	15	
