= 2002–03 St. Francis Terriers men's basketball team =

American college basketball season

2002–03 St. Francis Terriers men's basketball
- Conference: Northeast Conference
- Record: 14–16 (9–9 NEC)
- Head coach: Ron Ganulin (12th season)
- Assistant coach: Glenn Braica (14th season)
- Home arena: Generoso Pope Athletic Complex

2002–03 Northeast Conference men's basketball standings
	Conf.				Overall
Team	W		L	PCT	W		L	PCT
Wagner †	14	–	4	.778	21	–	11	.656
Monmouth	13	–	5	.722	15	–	13	.536
Central Connecticut	12	–	6	.667	15	–	13	.536
Quinnipiac	10	–	8	.556	17	–	12	.586
Saint Francis (PA)	10	–	8	.556	14	–	14	.500
St. Francis (NY)	9	–	9	.500	14	–	16	.467
Fairleigh Dickinson	9	–	9	.500	15	–	14	.517
Long Island	7	–	11	.389	9	–	19	.321
Robert Morris	7	–	11	.389	10	–	17	.370
Mount St. Mary's	6	–	12	.333	11	–	16	.407
Sacred Heart	6	–	12	.333	8	–	21	.276
UMBC	5	–	13	.278	7	–	20	.259
† 2003 NEC tournament winner

The 2002–03 St. Francis Terriers men's basketball team represented St. Francis College during the 2002–03 NCAA Division I men's basketball season. The team was coached by Ron Ganulin, who was in his twelfth year at the helm of the St. Francis Terriers. The Terrier's home games were played at the Generoso Pope Athletic Complex. The team has been a member of the Northeast Conference since 1981.

The Terriers were 14-16 overall on the season and 9-9 in conference play, yet the Terriers qualified for the NEC Tournament. During the Tournament the Terriers were able to upset Central Connecticut and Fairleigh Dickinson in the quarterfinals and semifinals, respectively, and made it to the NEC Tournament finals. The Terriers were only one win shy of participating in the programs first NCAA Tournament before losing to Wagner 61–78 on the road.

== Roster ==
2002–03 St. Francis Brooklyn Terriers men's basketball team
Players
Coaches

Pos.	#	Name	Height	Weight	Year	Hometown
F/C	13	Paul Kowalczuk	6 ft 10 in (2.08 m)	225 lb (102 kg)	Sr	Koszalin, Poland
F	23	Clifford Strong	6 ft 8 in (2.03 m)	220 lb (100 kg)	Sr	Brooklyn, New York
F	42	Eric Thompson	6 ft 8 in (2.03 m)	215 lb (98 kg)	Jr	Brooklyn, New York
G	00	Mike Wilson	6 ft 2 in (1.88 m)	185 lb (84 kg)	Jr	Naugatuck, Connecticut
G	3	John Quintana	6 ft 0 in (1.83 m)	200 lb (91 kg)	Jr	Brooklyn, New York
G	15	Bronski Dockery	6 ft 2 in (1.88 m)	190 lb (86 kg)	So	Manhattan, New York
G	40	Omar Hatcher	6 ft 2 in (1.88 m)	185 lb (84 kg)	So	Philadelphia, Pennsylvania
F	25	Damien Herard	6 ft 7 in (2.01 m)	225 lb (102 kg)	So	Jamaica, New York
F	44	Christopher Sockwell	6 ft 8 in (2.03 m)	240 lb (109 kg)	So	Brooklyn, New York
G	11	Rob Wiatre	6 ft 0 in (1.83 m)	180 lb (82 kg)	So	Brooklyn, New York
G	3	Tory Cavalieri	6 ft 0 in (1.83 m)	180 lb (82 kg)	So	Atlantic City, New Jersey
F	34	Patrice Thevenot	6 ft 6 in (1.98 m)	235 lb (107 kg)	So	Brooklyn, New York
G/F	13	Christian Brown	6 ft 4 in (1.93 m)	190 lb (86 kg)	Fr	Manhattan, New York
F	21	Devon Neckles	6 ft 7 in (2.01 m)	190 lb (86 kg)	Fr	Brooklyn, New York

Head coach

- Ron Ganulin (LIU Brooklyn '67)

Assistant coach(es)

- Glenn Braica (Queens College '89)

Legend

- (C) Team captain
- (S) Suspended
- (I) Ineligible
- (W) Walk-on
- Injured
- Current redshirt

== Schedule and results ==
Date time, TV	Opponent	Result	Record	Site (attendance) city, state
Regular season
November 25, 2002*; 9:00 pm	at Hofstra	W 72–56	1–0	Westchester County Center (N/A); Westchester, NY
November 27, 2002*; 7:00 pm	at Saint Peter's	L 85–94	1–1	Yanitelli Center (653); Jersey City, NJ
December 2, 2002*; 8:00 pm	at Seton Hall	L 76–84	1–2	Izod Center (5,506); East Rutherford, NJ
December 7, 2002*; 4:00 pm	at Howard	W 88–67	2–2	Burr Gymnasium (840); Washington, DC
December 11, 2002*; 7:30 pm	at St. John's (NY)	L 58–80	2–3	Carnesecca Arena (5,462); Queens, NY
December 15, 2002; 12:00 pm	at Long Island	L 76–89	2–4 (0–1)	Schwartz Athletic Center (875); Brooklyn, NY
December 27, 2002*; 6:00 pm	vs. Duquesne; FIU New Year's Classic	L 57–67	2–5	Golden Panther Arena (N/A); Miami, FL
December 28, 2002*; 6:00 pm	vs. Radford; FIU New Year's Classic	W 69–63	3–5	Golden Panther Arena (N/A); Miami, FL
January 4, 2003*; 7:00 pm	at Lehigh	L 68–74	3–6	Stabler Arena (1,112); Bethlehem, PA
January 7, 2003*; 7:00 pm	at Binghamton	L 62–74	3–7	West Gymasuium (1,325); Binghamton, NY
January 11, 2003; 7:00 pm	at Monmouth	L 76–80	3–8 (0–2)	William T. Boylan Gymnasium (2,065); West Long Branch, NJ
January 13, 2003; 7:00 pm	at Fairleigh Dickinson	L 71–76 ^{2OT}	3–9 (0–3)	Rothman Center (425); Hackensack, NJ
January 18, 2003; 7:00 pm	at UMBC	L 58–73	3–10 (0–4)	Retriever Activities Center (2,134); Catonsville, MD
January 20, 2003; 7:30 pm	at Mount St. Mary's	L 58–69	3–11 (0–5)	Knott Arena (1,278); Emmitsburg, MD
January 25, 2003; 4:30 pm	Mount St. Mary's	W 73–54	4–11 (1–5)	Generoso Pope Athletic Complex (540); Brooklyn, NY
January 27, 2003; 7:00 pm	UMBC	L 66–69	4–12 (1–6)	Generoso Pope Athletic Complex (415); Brooklyn, NY
February 1, 2003; 4:30 pm	Quinnipiac	W 91–76	5–12 (2–6)	Generoso Pope Athletic Complex (713); Brooklyn, NY
February 3, 2003; 7:00 pm	at Central Connecticut State	L 59–71	5–13 (2–7)	William H. Detrick Gymnasium (1,954); New Britain, CT
February 6, 2003; 7:30 pm	at Robert Morris	W 77–72	6–13 (3–7)	Charles L. Sewall Center (336); Moon Township, PA
February 8, 2003; 7:00 pm	at Saint Francis (PA)	L 72–89	6–14 (3–8)	DeGol Arena (1,856); Loretto, PA
February 10, 2003; 7:00 pm	Central Connecticut State	W 78–55	7–14 (4–8)	Generoso Pope Athletic Complex (463); Brooklyn, NY
February 13, 2003; 7:00 pm	Monmouth	W 81–71	8–14 (5–8)	Generoso Pope Athletic Complex (563); Brooklyn, NY
February 15, 2003; 4:00 pm	Fairleigh Dickinson	W 85–80	9–14 (6–8)	Generoso Pope Athletic Complex (438); Brooklyn, NY
February 20, 2003; 7:30 pm	at Quinnipiac	L 61–80	9–15 (6–9)	Burt Kahn Court (1,856); Hamden, CT
February 22, 2003; 4:30 pm	Long Island; Battle of Brooklyn	W 142–140 ^{2OT}	10–15 (7–9)	Generoso Pope Athletic Complex (814); Brooklyn, NY
February 27, 2003; 7:00 pm	Sacred Heart	W 110–92	11–15 (8–9)	Generoso Pope Athletic Complex (573); Brooklyn, NY
March 1, 2003; 4:00 pm	Wagner	W 96–84	12–15 (9–9)	Generoso Pope Athletic Complex (861); Brooklyn, NY
2003 NEC tournament
March 8, 2003; 8:00 pm	vs. Central Connecticut State; Quarterfinals	W 67–62	13–15	Spiro Sports Center (N/A); Staten Island, NY
March 9, 2003; 4:00 pm	vs. Fairleigh Dickinson; Semifinals	W 88–62	14–15	Spiro Sports Center (2,625); Staten Island, NY
March 12, 2003; 7:00 pm	at Wagner; Finals	L 61–78	14–16	Spiro Sports Center (2,327); Staten Island, NY
*Non-conference game. ^{#}Rankings from AP Poll. (#) Tournament seedings in parentheses.
