= 2003 Southern Conference men's basketball tournament =

- Classification: Division I
- Season: 2002–03
- Teams: 12
- Site: North Charleston Coliseum; North Charleston, SC
- Champions: East Tennessee State (5th title)
- Winning coach: Ed DeChellis (1st title)
- MVP: Tim Smith (East Tennessee State)
- Top scorer: Radee Skipworth (VMI) (75 points)

2002–03 Southern Conference men's basketball standings
	Conf.				Overall
Team	W		L	PCT	W		L	PCT
North
Davidson	11	–	5	.688	17	–	10	.630
East Tennessee State †	11	–	5	.688	20	–	11	.645
Appalachian State	11	–	5	.688	19	–	10	.655
Western Carolina	6	–	10	.375	9	–	19	.321
VMI	3	–	13	.188	10	–	20	.333
UNC Greensboro	3	–	13	.188	7	–	22	.241
South
College of Charleston	13	–	3	.813	25	–	8	.758
Chattanooga	11	–	5	.688	21	–	9	.700
Georgia Southern	8	–	8	.500	16	–	13	.552
Wofford	8	–	8	.500	14	–	15	.483
Furman	8	–	8	.500	14	–	17	.452
The Citadel	3	–	13	.188	8	–	20	.286
† SoCon Tournament winner As of April 30, 2003; Rankings from AP poll

The 2003 Southern Conference men's basketball tournament took place from March 5–8, 2003 at the North Charleston Coliseum in North Charleston, South Carolina. The East Tennessee State Buccaneers defeated their in-state rival Chattanooga in the championship game to win their fifth title in school history and receive the automatic berth to the 2003 NCAA tournament. Tim Smith of ETSU was named the tournament's Most Valuable Player.

== Format ==
All twelve teams were eligible for the tournament. The tournament used a preset bracket consisting of four rounds, the first of which featured four games, with the winners moving on to the quarterfinal round. The top two finishers in each division received first round byes.

== Bracket ==
First round March 5
3N	Appalachian State	73
6S	The Citadel	63
4S	Furman	56
5N	VMI	62
3S	Wofford	77
6N	UNC Greensboro	73
4N	Western Carolina	81
5S	Georgia Southern	89

Quarterfinals; March 6
2S	Chattanooga	98
3N	Appalachian State	67
1N	Davidson	60
5N	VMI	66
2N	East Tennessee St.	80
3S	Wofford	75
1S	Coll. of Charleston	67
5S	Georgia Southern	53

Semifinals; March 7
2S	Chattanooga	77
5N	VMI	58
1S	Coll. of Charleston	55
2N	East Tennessee St.	64

Championship Game; March 8
2S	Chattanooga	90
2N	East Tennessee St.	97

* Overtime game

== See also ==
- List of Southern Conference men's basketball champions
