= 2003 Conference USA men's basketball tournament =

- Classification: Division I
- Season: 2002–03
- Teams: 12
- Site: Freedom Hall; Louisville, KY
- Champions: Louisville (1st title)
- Winning coach: Rick Pitino (1st title)
- MVP: Luke Whitehead (Louisville)

2002–03 Conference USA men's basketball standings
	Conf.				Overall
Team	W		L	PCT	W		L	PCT
American
No. 9 Marquette	14	–	2	.875	27	–	6	.818
No. 14 Louisville †	11	–	5	.688	25	–	7	.781
Cincinnati	9	–	7	.563	17	–	12	.586
Saint Louis	9	–	7	.563	16	–	14	.533
DePaul	8	–	8	.500	16	–	13	.552
Charlotte	8	–	8	.500	13	–	16	.448
East Carolina	3	–	13	.188	12	–	15	.444
National
No. 19 Memphis	13	–	3	.813	23	–	7	.767
UAB	8	–	8	.500	21	–	13	.618
Tulane	8	–	8	.500	16	–	15	.516
South Florida	7	–	9	.438	15	–	14	.517
Houston	6	–	10	.375	8	–	20	.286
Southern Miss	5	–	11	.313	13	–	16	.448
TCU	3	–	13	.188	9	–	19	.321
† 2003 Conference USA Tournament winner Rankings from AP Poll

The 2003 Conference USA men's basketball tournament was held March 12–15 at Freedom Hall in Louisville, Kentucky.

Louisville defeated upstart UAB in the championship game, 83–78, to clinch their first Conference USA men's tournament championship.

The Cardinals, in turn, received an automatic bid to the 2003 NCAA tournament. They were joined in the tournament by fellow C-USA members Cincinnati, Marquette, and Memphis, all of whom earned at-large bids.

== Format ==
There were no changes to the tournament format from the previous year. The top four teams were given byes into the quarterfinal round while the next eight teams were placed into the first round. The two teams with the worst conference records were not invited to the tournament. All remaining tournament seeds were determined by regular season conference records.

== Bracket ==
First round Wednesday, March 12
9	Charlotte	61
8	UAB	85
5	Cincinnati	61
12	Southern Miss	63
11	Houston	52
6	Tulane	74
7	DePaul	74
10	South Florida	76

Quarterfinals; Thursday, March 13
1	#8 Marquette	76
8	UAB	83
12	Southern Miss	56
4	Saint Louis	69
3	#20 Louisville	82
6	Tulane	66
10	South Florida	56
2	#16 Memphis	62

Semifinals; Friday, March 14
8	UAB	63
4	Saint Louis	62
3	#20 Louisville	78
2	#16 Memphis	75

Championship; Saturday, March 15
8	UAB	78
3	#20 Louisville	83
