= M&T Bank Arena =

Indoor multipurpose arena in Hamden, Connecticut

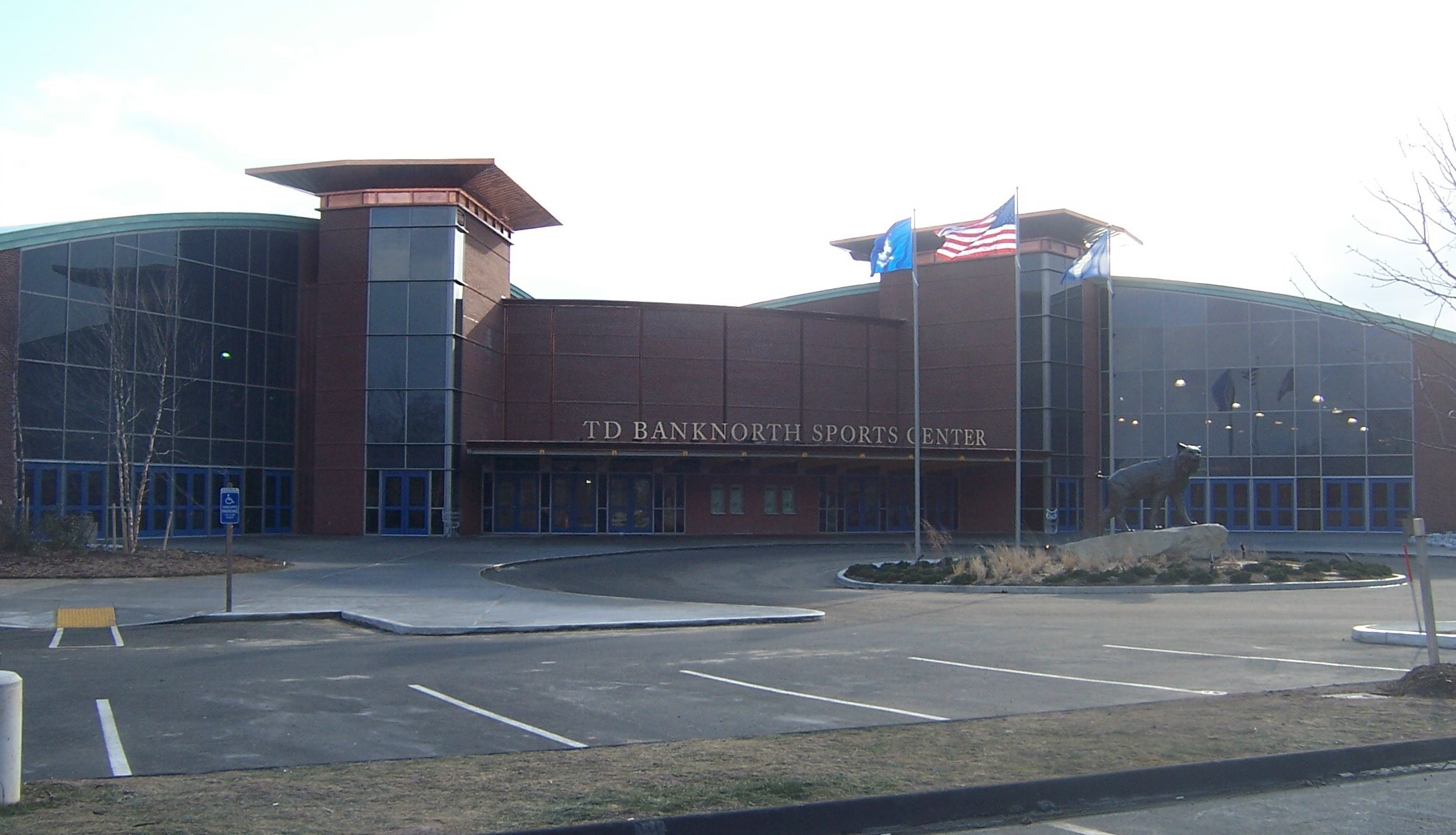
- M&T Bank Arena in February 2007
- Interactive map of M&T Bank Arena
- Former names: TD Banknorth Sports Center (2007–2009); TD Bank Sports Center (2009–2018); People's United Center (2018–2022)
- Location: 305 Sherman Avenue; Hamden, CT 06518
- Coordinates: 41.413833°N 72.911157°W
- Owner: Quinnipiac University
- Operator: Quinnipiac University
- Capacity: 3,570 (Basketball); 3,386 (Ice Hockey)
- Surface: Multi-surface (200 x 85 ft for hockey)

Construction
- Groundbreaking: October 7, 2004
- Opened: January 27, 2007
- Cost: $52 million ($80.7 million in 2025 dollars)
- Architect: Centerbrook Architects & Planners
- Structural engineers: Gilsanz Murray Steficek LLP Engineers and Architects
- Services engineers: R.G. Vanderweil Engineers, LLP
- General contractor: Dimeo Construction

Tenant
- Quinnipiac Bobcats (NCAA) (2007–present)

M&T Bank Arena, previously known as TD Bank Sports Center and People's United Center, is a multi-purpose arena in Hamden, Connecticut. Its design is unusual in that it consists of two separate playing and seating areas, one intended for basketball and one intended for ice hockey, joined together within a common facility. It seats 3,570 for basketball and 3,386 for hockey. Officially, the hockey side is known as the Frank Perrotti, Jr. Arena.

The center opened on January 27, 2007, and is home to the Quinnipiac University men’s and women’s basketball and men’s and women’s ice hockey teams. It replaced Burt Kahn Court for the basketball team and the Northford Ice Pavilion for ice hockey. It is located on Quinnipiac's York Hill Campus and is part of a large expansion project for that campus.

The center cost $52 million to build. Its creation is part of an ambitious plan by Quinnipiac to improve its drawing power for student athletes.

== Events ==
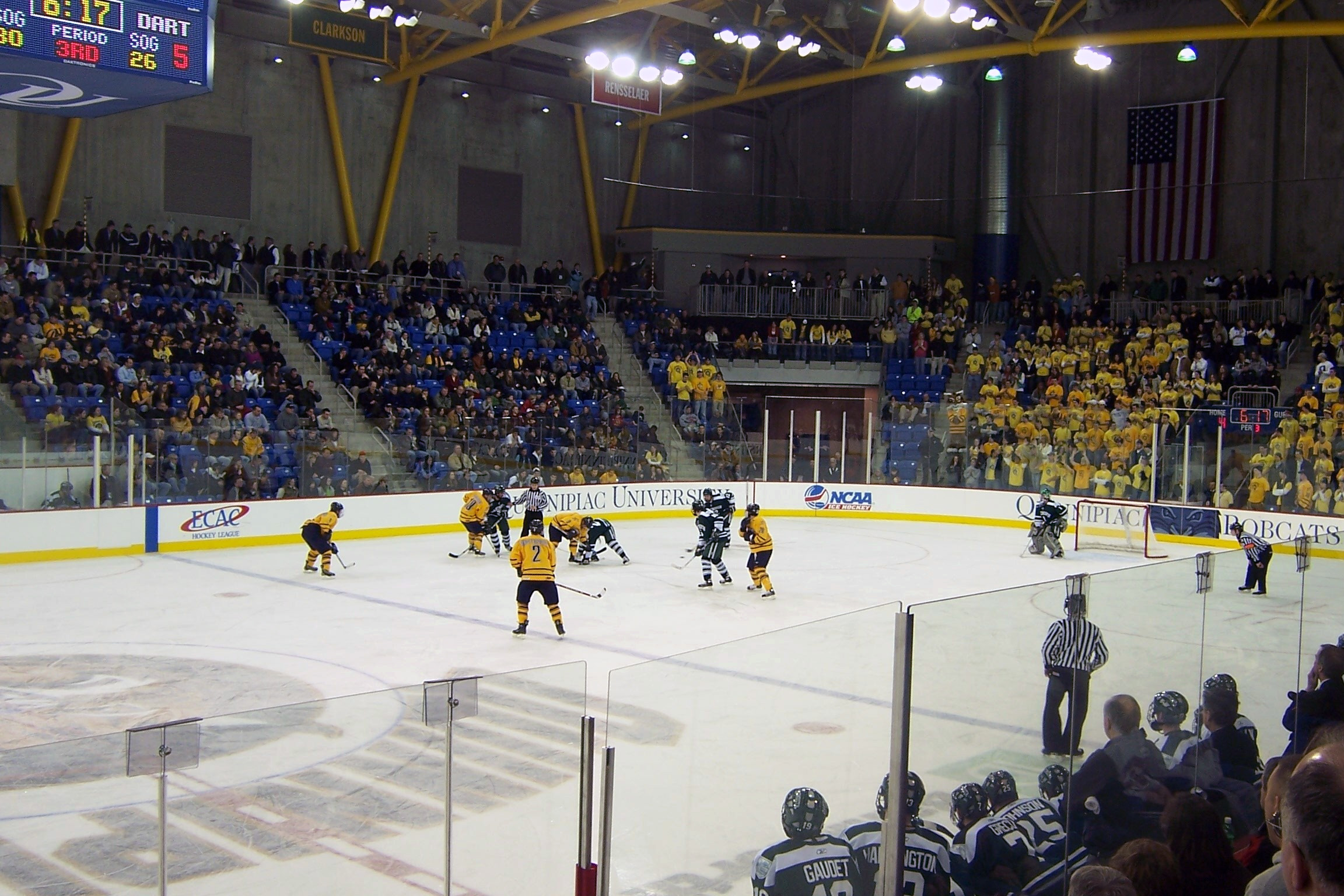
Dartmouth vs. Quinnipiac men's action on the hockey side, February 2007. Quinnipiac student section is on right.

- 2014 NCAA D1 Women's Frozen Four
- 2019 NCAA D1 Women's Frozen Four

== See also ==
- Enterprise Center (St. Louis, Missouri)
- TD Ameritrade Park Omaha (Nebraska)
- TD Arena (Charleston, South Carolina)
- List of NCAA Division I basketball arenas
