= 2002–03 East Tennessee State Buccaneers men's basketball team =

American college basketball season

2002–03 East Tennessee State Buccaneers men's basketball
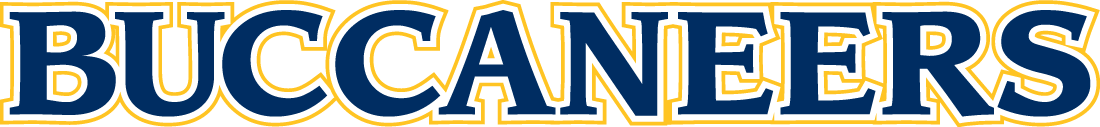

SoCon tournament champion

NCAA tournament
- Conference: Southern Conference
- Record: 20–11 (11–5 SoCon)
- Head coach: Ed DeChellis (7th season)
- Home arena: Memorial Center

2002–03 Southern Conference men's basketball standings
	Conf.				Overall
Team	W		L	PCT	W		L	PCT
North
Davidson	11	–	5	.688	17	–	10	.630
East Tennessee State †	11	–	5	.688	20	–	11	.645
Appalachian State	11	–	5	.688	19	–	10	.655
Western Carolina	6	–	10	.375	9	–	19	.321
VMI	3	–	13	.188	10	–	20	.333
UNC Greensboro	3	–	13	.188	7	–	22	.241
South
College of Charleston	13	–	3	.813	25	–	8	.758
Chattanooga	11	–	5	.688	21	–	9	.700
Georgia Southern	8	–	8	.500	16	–	13	.552
Wofford	8	–	8	.500	14	–	15	.483
Furman	8	–	8	.500	14	–	17	.452
The Citadel	3	–	13	.188	8	–	20	.286
† SoCon Tournament winner As of April 30, 2003; Rankings from AP poll

The 2002–03 East Tennessee State Buccaneers men's basketball team represented East Tennessee State University in the 2002–03 NCAA Division I men's basketball season. The Buccaneers, led by head coach Ed DeChellis, played their home games at the Memorial Center in Johnson City, Tennessee, as members of the Southern Conference. After finishing tied for first in the conference regular season standings, the Buccaneers won the SoCon tournament to earn an automatic bid to the NCAA tournament as No. 15 seed in the East region. East Tennessee State was beaten by No. 2 seed Wake Forest in the opening round, 76–73.

== Roster ==
2002–03 East Tennessee State Buccaneers men's basketball team
Players
Coaches

Pos.	#	Name	Height	Weight	Year	Hometown
F	1	Jerald Fields	6 ft 7 in (2.01 m)	260 lb (118 kg)	Jr	Gainesville, Florida
G	5	Tim Smith	5 ft 9 in (1.75 m)	155 lb (70 kg)	Fr	Newport News, Virginia
F	44	Zakee Wadood	6 ft 6 in (1.98 m)	220 lb (100 kg)	Jr	Lonoke, Arkansas

Head coach

- Ed DeChellis (UAB)

Assistant coach(es)

Legend

- (C) Team captain
- (S) Suspended
- (I) Ineligible
- (W) Walk-on
- Injured
- Current redshirt

Roster

== Schedule and results ==
Date time, TV	Rank^{#}	Opponent^{#}	Result	Record	Site (attendance) city, state
Regular season
Nov 22, 2002*		Guilford	W 104–37	1–0	Memorial Center; Johnson City, Tennessee
Nov 24, 2002*		at South Carolina	L 66–71	1–1	Carolina Center; Columbia, South Carolina
Nov 30, 2002*		at UNC Wilmington	L 57–78	1–2	Trask Coliseum; Wilmington, North Carolina
Dec 4, 2002*		at Vanderbilt	L 75–86	1–3	Memorial Gymnasium; Nashville, Tennessee
Dec 7, 2002*		UNC Asheville	W 87–69	2–3	Memorial Center; Johnson City, Tennessee
Dec 14, 2002*		Virginia–Wise	W 106–70	3–3	Memorial Center; Johnson City, Tennessee
Dec 17, 2002*		at Virginia	L 76–84	3–4	University Hall; Charlottesville, Virginia
Dec 20, 2002*		Coastal Carolina	W 93–82	4–4	Memorial Center; Johnson City, Tennessee
Dec 28, 2002*		vs. Belmont; South Florida Shootout	W 71–61	5–4	Sun Dome; Tampa, Florida
Dec 29, 2002*		at South Florida; South Florida Shootout	L 56–68	5–5	Sun Dome; Tampa, Florida
Jan 2, 2003*		Juniata	W 108–57	6–5	Memorial Center; Johnson City, Tennessee
Jan 4, 2003		UNC Greensboro	W 96–94	7–5 (1–0)	Memorial Center; Johnson City, Tennessee
Jan 6, 2003		at Appalachian State	L 94–108	7–6 (1–1)	Holmes Center; Boone, North Carolina
Jan 11, 2003		The Citadel	W 87–81	8–6 (2–1)	Memorial Center; Johnson City, Tennessee
Jan 13, 2003		College of Charleston	W 65–61	9–6 (3–1)	Memorial Center; Johnson City, Tennessee
Jan 18, 2003		at VMI	W 67–62	10–6 (4–1)	Cameron Hall; Lexington, Virginia
Jan 25, 2003		at Wofford	W 81–61	11–6 (5–1)	Benjamin Johnson Arena; Spartanburg, South Carolina
Jan 27, 2003		Davidson	L 71–80	11–7 (5–2)	Memorial Center; Johnson City, Tennessee
Feb 1, 2003		at Chattanooga	L 94–99	11–8 (5–3)	McKenzie Arena; Chattanooga, Tennessee
Feb 4, 2003		VMI	W 93–76	12–8 (6–3)	Memorial Center; Johnson City, Tennessee
Feb 8, 2003		at Georgia Southern	L 83–87	12–9 (6–4)	Hanner Fieldhouse; Statesboro, Georgia
Feb 10, 2003		Western Carolina	W 89–71	13–9 (7–4)	Memorial Center; Johnson City, Tennessee
Feb 15, 2003		at Davidson	W 87–72	14–9 (8–4)	Belk Arena; Davidson, North Carolina
Feb 18, 2003		at UNC Greensboro	W 75–73	15–9 (9–4)	Bodford Arena; Greensboro, North Carolina
Feb 22, 2003		at Western Carolina	W 89–86	16–9 (10–4)	Ramsey Center; Cullowhee, North Carolina
Feb 24, 2003		Furman	L 71–84	16–10 (10–5)	Memorial Center; Johnson City, Tennessee
Mar 1, 2003		Appalachian State	W 88–78	17–10 (11–5)	Memorial Center; Johnson City, Tennessee
SoCon tournament
Mar 6, 2003*	(2N)	vs. (3S) Wofford; Quarterfinals	W 80–75	18–10	North Charleston Coliseum; North Charleston, South Carolina
Mar 7, 2003*	(2N)	vs. (1S) College of Charleston; Semifinals	W 64–55	19–10	North Charleston Coliseum; North Charleston, South Carolina
Mar 8, 2003*	(2N)	vs. (2S) Chattanooga; Championship game	W 97–90	20–10	North Charleston Coliseum; North Charleston, South Carolina
NCAA tournament
Mar 21, 2003*	(15 E)	vs. (2 E) No. 8 Wake Forest; First round	L 73–76	20–11	St. Pete Times Forum; Tampa, Florida
*Non-conference game. ^{#}Rankings from AP poll. (#) Tournament seedings in parentheses. E=East. N=North. S=South. All times are in Eastern.
