= 2002–03 Cincinnati Bearcats men's basketball team =

American college basketball season

2002–03 Cincinnati Bearcats men's basketball

NCAA tournament, First round
- Conference: Conference USA
- American
- Record: 17–12 (9–7 C-USA)
- Head coach: Bob Huggins (14th season)
- Assistant coaches: Mick Cronin (7th season); Andy Kennedy (2nd season)
- Home arena: Myrl Shoemaker Center

2002–03 Conference USA men's basketball standings
	Conf.				Overall
Team	W		L	PCT	W		L	PCT
American
No. 9 Marquette	14	–	2	.875	27	–	6	.818
No. 14 Louisville †	11	–	5	.688	25	–	7	.781
Cincinnati	9	–	7	.563	17	–	12	.586
Saint Louis	9	–	7	.563	16	–	14	.533
DePaul	8	–	8	.500	16	–	13	.552
Charlotte	8	–	8	.500	13	–	16	.448
East Carolina	3	–	13	.188	12	–	15	.444
National
No. 19 Memphis	13	–	3	.813	23	–	7	.767
UAB	8	–	8	.500	21	–	13	.618
Tulane	8	–	8	.500	16	–	15	.516
South Florida	7	–	9	.438	15	–	14	.517
Houston	6	–	10	.375	8	–	20	.286
Southern Miss	5	–	11	.313	13	–	16	.448
TCU	3	–	13	.188	9	–	19	.321
† 2003 Conference USA Tournament winner Rankings from AP Poll

The 2002–03 Cincinnati Bearcats men's basketball team represented University of Cincinnati as a member of Conference USA during the 2002–03 NCAA Division I men's basketball season. The head coach was Bob Huggins, serving in his 14th year at the school. The team finished third in the American division of the conference regular season standings and won the Conference USA tournament title to earn an automatic bid to the NCAA tournament as No. 8 seed in the West region. Cincinnati was beaten in the opening round by No. 9 seed Gonzaga, 74–69. The Bearcats finished with a 17–12 record (9–7 C-USA).

== Roster ==
2002–03 Cincinnati Bearcats men's basketball team
Players
Coaches

Pos.	#	Name	Height	Weight	Year	Hometown
G	2	Field Williams	6 ft 4 in (1.93 m)	235 lb (107 kg)	Jr	Houston, Texas
G	3	John Meeker (W)	6 ft 1 in (1.85 m)	175 lb (79 kg)	Jr	Troy, Ohio
G	10	Jamaal Lucas	6 ft 2 in (1.88 m)	195 lb (88 kg)	Jr	Corpus Christi, Texas
G	13	Leonard Stokes	6 ft 6 in (1.98 m)	200 lb (91 kg)	Sr	Buffalo, New York
G	20	Taron Barker	6 ft 1 in (1.85 m)	190 lb (86 kg)	Sr	Racine, Wisconsin
F	24	Rod Flowers	6 ft 8 in (2.03 m)	240 lb (109 kg)	Jr	Huntsville, Alabama
F	43	Jimmy Hubbard	6 ft 6 in (1.98 m)	222 lb (101 kg)	Sr	Belton, Missouri
C	44	B. J. Grove	6 ft 11 in (2.11 m)	280 lb (127 kg)	Sr	Cincinnati, Ohio
C	50	Donald Little	6 ft 11 in (2.11 m)	225 lb (102 kg)	Sr	Augusta, Georgia
F	54	Jason Maxiell	6 ft 7 in (2.01 m)	250 lb (113 kg)	So	Chicago, Illinois

Head coach

- Bob Huggins

Assistant coach(es)

- Mick Cronin
- Andy Kennedy

Legend

- (C) Team captain
- (S) Suspended
- (I) Ineligible
- (W) Walk-on
- Injured
- Current redshirt

== Schedule and results ==
Date time, TV	Rank^{#}	Opponent^{#}	Result	Record	Site city, state
Regular Season
Dec 7, 2002*		No. 16 Xavier; Crosstown Shootout	L 44–50	3–2	Myrl Shoemaker Center; Cincinnati, Ohio
Dec 17, 2002*		vs. No. 5 Oregon	W 77–52	5–2	Continental Airlines Arena; East Rutherford, New Jersey
Conference USA Tournament
Mar 12, 2003*		vs. Southern Miss; Quarterfinals	L 61–63	17–11	Freedom Hall; Louisville, Kentucky
NCAA Tournament
Mar 20, 2003*	(8 W)	vs. (9 W) Gonzaga; First Round	L 69–74	17–12	Jon M. Huntsman Center; Salt Lake City, Utah
*Non-conference game. ^{#}Rankings from AP Poll. (#) Tournament seedings in parentheses. W=West.
