= 2002–03 Louisville Cardinals men's basketball team =

American college basketball season

2002–03 Louisville Cardinals men's basketball

NCAA tournament, Round of 32
- Conference: Conference USA

Ranking
- Coaches: No. 19
- AP: No. 14
- Record: 25–7 (11–5 C-USA)
- Head coach: Rick Pitino (2nd season)
- Home arena: Freedom Hall

2002–03 Conference USA men's basketball standings
	Conf.				Overall
Team	W		L	PCT	W		L	PCT
American
No. 9 Marquette	14	–	2	.875	27	–	6	.818
No. 14 Louisville †	11	–	5	.688	25	–	7	.781
Cincinnati	9	–	7	.563	17	–	12	.586
Saint Louis	9	–	7	.563	16	–	14	.533
DePaul	8	–	8	.500	16	–	13	.552
Charlotte	8	–	8	.500	13	–	16	.448
East Carolina	3	–	13	.188	12	–	15	.444
National
No. 19 Memphis	13	–	3	.813	23	–	7	.767
UAB	8	–	8	.500	21	–	13	.618
Tulane	8	–	8	.500	16	–	15	.516
South Florida	7	–	9	.438	15	–	14	.517
Houston	6	–	10	.375	8	–	20	.286
Southern Miss	5	–	11	.313	13	–	16	.448
TCU	3	–	13	.188	9	–	19	.321
† 2003 Conference USA Tournament winner Rankings from AP Poll

The 2002–03 Louisville Cardinals men's basketball team represented the University of Louisville in the 2002–03 NCAA Division I men's basketball season. The head coach was Rick Pitino and the team finished the season with an overall record of 25–7.

== Roster ==
2004–05 Louisville Cardinals men's basketball team
Players	Coaches
Pos. / # / Name / Height / Weight / Year / Previous school / Hometown; SF / 32 / Francisco García / 6 ft 7 in (2.01 m) / 195 lb (88 kg) / Fr	Head coach: Rick Pitino (UMass); Assistant coach(es) Legend: (C) Team captain; (S) Suspended; (I) Ineligible; (W) Walk-on; Injured; Current redshirt

== Schedule and results ==
Date time, TV	Rank^{#}	Opponent^{#}	Result	Record	Site city, state
Regular Season
Nov 23, 2002*		Air Force	W 65–47	1–0	Freedom Hall; Louisville, Kentucky
Nov 30, 2002*		vs. Purdue	L 84–86	1–1	Conseco Fieldhouse; Indianapolis, Indiana
Dec 7, 2002*		South Alabama	W 90–79	2–1	Freedom Hall; Louisville, Kentucky
Dec 14, 2002*		at Seton Hall	W 91–70	3–1	Continental Airlines Arena; East Rutherford, New Jersey
Dec 17, 2002*		Eastern Kentucky	W 104–63	4–1	Freedom Hall; Louisville, Kentucky
Dec 18, 2002*		Manhattan	W 89–62	5–1	Freedom Hall; Louisville, Kentucky
Dec 22, 2002*		Furman	W 104–63	6–1	Freedom Hall; Louisville, Kentucky
Dec 28, 2002*		No. 14 Kentucky; Rivalry	W 81–63	7–1	Freedom Hall; Louisville, Kentucky
Jan 4, 2003*		at Ohio State	W 72–64 ^{OT}	8–1	Value City Arena; Columbus, Ohio
Jan 8, 2003*		at Charlotte	W 80–59	9–1	Dale F. Halton Arena; Charlotte, North Carolina
Jan 11, 2003*		Saint Louis	W 73–54	10–1	Freedom Hall; Louisville, Kentucky
Jan 16, 2003*		at East Carolina	W 87–70	11–1	Williams Arena at Minges Coliseum; Greenville, North Carolina
Jan 18, 2003*		TCU	W 87–74	12–1	Freedom Hall; Louisville, Kentucky
Jan 22, 2003*		DePaul	W 71–43	13–1	Freedom Hall; Louisville, Kentucky
Jan 25, 2003*		at Tennessee	W 72–69	14–1	Thompson-Boling Arena; Knoxville, Tennessee
Jan 29, 2003*		at Southern Miss	W 94–65	15–1	Reed Green Coliseum; Hattiesburg, Mississippi
Feb 1, 2003*		No. 19 Indiana	W 95–76	16–1	Freedom Hall; Louisville, Kentucky
Feb 5, 2003*		Cincinnati	W 77–71	17–1	Freedom Hall; Louisville, Kentucky
Feb 8, 2003*		at Houston	W 81–55	18–1	Hofheinz Pavilion; Houston, Texas
Feb 12, 2003*		at Saint Louis	L 58–59	18–2	Savvis Center; St. Louis, Missouri
Feb 15, 2003*		at No. 11 Marquette	W 73–70	19–2	Bradley Center; Milwaukee, Wisconsin
Feb 19, 2003	No. 4	Memphis	L 73–80	19–3	Freedom Hall; Louisville, Kentucky
Feb 22, 2003	No. 4	at Cincinnati	L 80–101	19–4	Myrl H. Shoemaker Center; Cincinnati, Ohio
Feb 27, 2003	No. 11	No. 10 Marquette	L 73–78	19–5	Freedom Hall; Louisville, Kentucky
Mar 1, 2003	No. 11	East Carolina	W 82–76	20–5	Freedom Hall; Louisville, Kentucky
Mar 5, 2003		at DePaul	L 76–79 ^{OT}	20–6	Allstate Arena; Rosemont, Illinois
Mar 8, 2003		Charlotte	W 100–59	21–6 (11–5)	Freedom Hall; Louisville, Kentucky
C-USA tournament
Mar 13, 2003*	No. 20	Tulane; Quarterfinals	W 82–66	22–6	Freedom Hall; Louisville, Kentucky
Mar 14, 2003*	No. 20	No. 16 Memphis; Semifinals	W 78–75	23–6	Freedom Hall; Louisville, Kentucky
Mar 15, 2003*	No. 20	UAB; Championship game	W 83–78	24–6	Freedom Hall; Louisville, Kentucky
NCAA tournament
Mar 21, 2003*	(4 E) No. 14	vs. (13 E) Austin Peay	W 86–64	25–6	BJCC Arena; Birmingham, Alabama
Mar 23, 2003*	(4 E) No. 14	vs. (5 E) Butler	L 71–79	25–7	BJCC Arena; Birmingham, Alabama
*Non-conference game. ^{#}Rankings from AP Poll. (#) Tournament seedings in parentheses. E=East.
