= 2002–03 Ivy League men's basketball season =

The 2002–03 Ivy League men's basketball season was the Ivy League's 49th season of basketball. The team with the best record (Penn Quakers) progressed to the 2003 NCAA Men's Division I Basketball Tournament. Penn's Ugonna Onyekwe won his second consecutive Ivy League Men's Basketball Player of the Year.

== Standings ==
School	Coach	W	L
Penn	Fran Dunphy	14	0
Brown	Glen Miller	12	2
Princeton	John Thompson III	10	4
Yale	James Jones	8	6
Harvard	Frank Sullivan	4	10
Cornell	Steve Donahue	4	10
Dartmouth	Dave Faucher	4	10
Columbia	Armond Hill	0	14

== Team stats ==
School	Points	Rebounds	Field goals	Free-Throws	Blocks
Harvard	71.4	38.0	.429	.680	2.37
Yale	69.3	33.7	.450	.736	2.26
Pennsylvania	70.2	33.5	.466	.702	2.15
Brown	74.0	32.9	.461	.744	3.68
Cornell	60.8	31.6	.428	.629	2.19
Columbia	49.6	31.1	.373	.671	3.44
Dartmouth	60.2	28.7	.419	.703	2.59
Princeton	66.5	28.4	.472	.690	1.67
