= 2002–03 Marquette Golden Eagles men's basketball team =

American college basketball season

2002–03 Marquette Golden Eagles men's basketball

Conference USA regular season champions

NCAA tournament, Final Four
- Conference: Conference USA

Ranking
- Coaches: No. 6
- AP: No. 9
- Record: 27–6 (14–2 C-USA)
- Head coach: Tom Crean (4th season)
- Assistant coaches: Darrin Horn (4th season); Dwayne Stephens (4th season)
- Home arena: Bradley Center

2002–03 Conference USA men's basketball standings
	Conf.				Overall
Team	W		L	PCT	W		L	PCT
American
No. 9 Marquette	14	–	2	.875	27	–	6	.818
No. 14 Louisville †	11	–	5	.688	25	–	7	.781
Cincinnati	9	–	7	.563	17	–	12	.586
Saint Louis	9	–	7	.563	16	–	14	.533
DePaul	8	–	8	.500	16	–	13	.552
Charlotte	8	–	8	.500	13	–	16	.448
East Carolina	3	–	13	.188	12	–	15	.444
National
No. 19 Memphis	13	–	3	.813	23	–	7	.767
UAB	8	–	8	.500	21	–	13	.618
Tulane	8	–	8	.500	16	–	15	.516
South Florida	7	–	9	.438	15	–	14	.517
Houston	6	–	10	.375	8	–	20	.286
Southern Miss	5	–	11	.313	13	–	16	.448
TCU	3	–	13	.188	9	–	19	.321
† 2003 Conference USA Tournament winner Rankings from AP Poll

The 2002–03 Marquette Golden Eagles men's basketball team represented Marquette University in NCAA Division I competition in the 2002–03 season. The Golden Eagles, coached by Tom Crean, were then a member of Conference USA; they did not join their current conference, the Big East, until the 2005–06 season.

Since their national championship in 1977, this is Marquette's sole Final Four appearance.

== Roster ==
2002–03 Marquette Golden Eagles men's basketball team
Players
Coaches

Pos.	#	Name	Height	Weight	Year	Hometown
G	10	Karon Bradley	5 ft 11 in (1.8 m)	185 lb (84 kg)	Fr	Katy, Texas
G	32	Joe Chapman	6 ft 4 in (1.93 m)	195 lb (88 kg)	Fr	Sauk Village, Illinois
G	34	Travis Diener	6 ft 1 in (1.85 m)	175 lb (79 kg)	So	Fond du Lac, Wisconsin
F	42	Andy Freund	6 ft 8 in (2.03 m)	210 lb (95 kg)	Fr	Wauwatosa, Wisconsin
G	23	Tony Gries	5 ft 10 in (1.78 m)	170 lb (77 kg)	Fr	Kiel, Wisconsin
C	33	Chris Grimm	6 ft 10 in (2.08 m)	225 lb (102 kg)	Fr	Brighton, Michigan
F	55	Robert Jackson	6 ft 10 in (2.08 m)	260 lb (118 kg)	Sr	Milwaukee, Wisconsin
C	5	Scott Merritt	6 ft 10 in (2.08 m)	245 lb (111 kg)	Jr	Wauwatosa, Wisconsin
F	20	Steve Novak	6 ft 10 in (2.08 m)	220 lb (100 kg)	Fr	Brown Deer, Wisconsin
F	40	Terry Sanders	6 ft 8 in (2.03 m)	225 lb (102 kg)	Jr	Milwaukee, Wisconsin
G	12	Jared Sichting	6 ft 0 in (1.83 m)	165 lb (75 kg)	Fr	Minnetonka, Minnesota
F	1	Todd Townsend	6 ft 7 in (2.01 m)	215 lb (98 kg)	So	Chicago, Illinois
G	3	Dwyane Wade	6 ft 4 in (1.93 m)	210 lb (95 kg)	Jr	Chicago, Illinois

Head coach

- Tom Crean

Assistant coach(es)

- Darrin Horn
- Dwayne Stephens

Legend

- (C) Team captain
- (S) Suspended
- (I) Ineligible
- (W) Walk-on
- Injured
- Current redshirt

== Schedule ==
Date time, TV	Rank^{#}	Opponent^{#}	Result	Record	Site city, state
November 15*	No. 18	vs. Villanova; Coaches vs Cancer Classic	W 73–61	1–0	Madison Square Garden; New York, New York
November 22*	No. 16	Coppin State	W 64–46	2–0	Bradley Center; Milwaukee, Wisconsin
November 23*	No. 16	UTSA	W 80–68	3–0	Bradley Center; Milwaukee, Wisconsin
November 26*	No. 13	Eastern Illinois	W 94–74	4–0	Bradley Center; Milwaukee, Wisconsin
December 2*	No. 13	at Notre Dame	L 71–92	4–1	Joyce Center; South Bend, Indiana
December 7*	No. 13	Appalachian State	W 101–78	5–1	Bradley Center; Milwaukee, Wisconsin
December 14*	No. 16	Wisconsin	W 63–54	6–1	Bradley Center; Milwaukee, Wisconsin
December 21*	No. 14	Elon	W 89–57	7–1	Bradley Center; Milwaukee, Wisconsin
December 28*	No. 13	Grambling State	W 105–74	8–1	Bradley Center; Milwaukee, Wisconsin
December 30	No. 13	at East Carolina	L 70–73	8–2 (0–1)	Williams Arena at Minges Coliseum; Greenville, North Carolina
Jan 4, 2003*	No. 13	at Dayton	L 85–92 ^{OT}	8–3	(University of Dayton Arena); Dayton, Ohio
Jan 7, 2003	No. 24	at Saint Louis	W 60–54	9–3 (1—1)	Savvis Center; St. Louis, Missouri
Jan 11, 2003	No. 24	South Florida	W 96–63	10–3 (2—1)	Bradley Center; Milwaukee, Wisconsin
Jan 14, 2003	No. 21	at Tulane	W 85–73	11–3 (3—1)	Avron B. Fogelman Arena; New Orleans, Louisiana
Jan 18, 2003	No. 21	at Charlotte	W 67–64	12–3 (4—1)	Dale F. Halton Arena; Charlotte, North Carolina
Jan 25, 2003	No. 20	DePaul	W 72–51	13–3 (5—1)	Bradley Center; Milwaukee, Wisconsin
Jan 29, 2003	No. 18	East Carolina	W 80–48	14–3 (6—1)	Bradley Center; Milwaukee, Wisconsin
Feb 1, 2003	No. 18	at Cincinnati	W 82–76	15–3 (7—1)	Fifth Third Arena; Cincinnati, Ohio
Feb 5, 2003	No. 15	Saint Louis	W 68–64	16–3 (8—1)	Bradley Center; Milwaukee, Wisconsin
Feb 9, 2003*	No. 15	No. 14 Wake Forest	W 68–61	17–3	Bradley Center; Milwaukee, Wisconsin
Feb 12, 2003	No. 11	at DePaul	W 73–60	18–3 (9—1)	Allstate Arena; Rosemont, Illinois
Feb 15, 2003	No. 11	No. 2 Louisville	L 70–73	18–4 (9—2)	Bradley Center; Milwaukee, Wisconsin
Feb 20, 2003	No. 11	Charlotte	W 75–67	19–4 (10—2)	Bradley Center; Milwaukee, Wisconsin
Feb 22, 2003	No. 11	at TCU	W 79–68	20–4 (11—2)	Daniel-Meyer Coliseum; Fort Worth, Texas
Feb 27, 2003	No. 10	at No. 11 Louisville	W 78–73	21–4 (12—2)	Freedom Hall; Louisville, Kentucky
Mar 1, 2003	No. 10	UAB	W 98–87	22–4 (13—2)	Bradley Center; Milwaukee, Wisconsin
Mar 8, 2003	No. 8	Cincinnati	W 70–61	23–4 (14–2)	Bradley Center; Milwaukee, Wisconsin
C-USA Tournament
Mar 13, 2003*	(1) No. 8	vs. (8) UAB; C-USA tournament quarterfinal	L 76–83	23–5	Freedom Hall; Louisville, Kentucky
NCAA tournament
Mar 20, 2003*	(3 MW) No. 9	vs. (14 MW) Holy Cross; First round	W 72–68	24–5	RCA Dome; Indianapolis, Indiana
Mar 22, 2003*	(3 MW) No. 9	vs. (6 MW) No. 24 Missouri; Second Round	W 101–92 ^{OT}	25–5	RCA Dome; Indianapolis, Indiana
Mar 27, 2003*	(3 MW) No. 9	vs. (2 MW) No. 4 Pittsburgh; Midwest Regional semifinal – Sweet Sixteen	W 77–74	26–5	Hubert H. Humphrey Metrodome; Minneapolis, Minnesota
Mar 29, 2003*	(3 MW) No. 9	vs. (1 MW) No. 1 Kentucky; Midwest Regional Final – Elite Eight	W 83–69	27–5	Hubert H. Humphrey Metrodome; Minneapolis, Minnesota
Apr 5, 2003*	(3 MW) No. 9	vs. (2 W) No. 6 Kansas; National semifinal – Final Four	L 61–94	27–6	Louisiana Superdome; New Orleans, Louisiana
*Non-conference game. ^{#}Rankings from AP poll. (#) Tournament seedings in parentheses. MW=Midwest.

== Awards and honors ==
- Dwyane Wade, C-USA Player of the year

== Team players drafted into the NBA ==
Round	Pick	Player	NBA club	Year
1	5	Dwyane Wade	Miami Heat	2003
2	2	Steve Novak	Houston Rockets	2006
2	8	Travis Diener	Orlando Magic	2005
