= 2002–03 Memphis Tigers men's basketball team =

American college basketball season

2002–03 Memphis Tigers men's basketball

C-USA National division champions

NCAA tournament, First round
- Conference: Conference USA
- National

Ranking
- AP: No. 19
- Record: 23–7 (13–3 C-USA)
- Head coach: John Calipari (3rd season)
- Assistant coaches: Tony Barbee; Derek Kellogg; John Robic
- Home arena: Pyramid Arena

2002–03 Conference USA men's basketball standings
	Conf.				Overall
Team	W		L	PCT	W		L	PCT
American
No. 9 Marquette	14	–	2	.875	27	–	6	.818
No. 14 Louisville †	11	–	5	.688	25	–	7	.781
Cincinnati	9	–	7	.563	17	–	12	.586
Saint Louis	9	–	7	.563	16	–	14	.533
DePaul	8	–	8	.500	16	–	13	.552
Charlotte	8	–	8	.500	13	–	16	.448
East Carolina	3	–	13	.188	12	–	15	.444
National
No. 19 Memphis	13	–	3	.813	23	–	7	.767
UAB	8	–	8	.500	21	–	13	.618
Tulane	8	–	8	.500	16	–	15	.516
South Florida	7	–	9	.438	15	–	14	.517
Houston	6	–	10	.375	8	–	20	.286
Southern Miss	5	–	11	.313	13	–	16	.448
TCU	3	–	13	.188	9	–	19	.321
† 2003 Conference USA Tournament winner Rankings from AP Poll

The 2002–03 Memphis Tigers men's basketball team represented the University of Memphis in the 2002–03 college basketball season, the 82nd season of Tiger basketball. The Tigers were coached by third-year head coach John Calipari, and they played their home games at the Pyramid Arena in Memphis, Tennessee.

== Roster ==
2002–03 Memphis Tigers men's basketball team
Players
Coaches

Pos.	#	Name	Height	Weight	Year	Previous school	Hometown
C	30	Earl Barron	6 ft 11 in (2.11 m)	205 lb (93 kg)	Jr	Clarksdale H.S.	Clarksdale, Mississippi
G	1	Antonio Burks	6 ft 0 in (1.83 m)	200 lb (91 kg)	Jr	Booker T. Washington	Memphis, Tennessee
F	10	Rodney Carney	6 ft 7 in (2.01 m)	205 lb (93 kg)	Fr	Northwest H.S.	Indianapolis, Indiana
C	45	Modibo Diarra	6 ft 11 in (2.11 m)	240 lb (109 kg)	Jr	Notre Dame Prep	Mali, West Africa
F	11	Duane Erwin	6 ft 9 in (2.06 m)	242 lb (110 kg)	So	Lee H.S.	Huntsville, Alabama
F	11	John Grice	6 ft 6 in (1.98 m)	205 lb (93 kg)	GS	Memphis Central; Southwest Tennessee C.C.	Memphis, Tennessee
G	5	Jeremy Hunt	6 ft 4 in (1.93 m)	195 lb (88 kg)	Fr	Craigmont	Memphis, Tennessee
F/C	4	Chris Massie	6 ft 9 in (2.06 m)	253 lb (115 kg)	Sr	Elkins H.S. Oxnard College	Arcola, Texas
G	23	Anthony Rice	6 ft 4 in (1.93 m)	205 lb (93 kg)	So	North Clayton	Atlanta, Georgia
G	12	Billy Richmond	6 ft 5 in (1.96 m)	207 lb (94 kg)	So	Hamilton	Memphis, Tennessee
G	32	Nathaniel Root	5 ft 11 in (1.8 m)	175 lb (79 kg)	Sr	Adamsville H.S.	Adamsville, Tennessee
F	15	Almamy Thiero	6 ft 10 in (2.08 m)	258 lb (117 kg)	Fr	Mount Zion	Mali, West Africa
G	0	Clyde Wade	6 ft 0 in (1.83 m)	180 lb (82 kg)	RS Fr	Kingsbury	Memphis, Tennessee

Head coach

- John Calipari (Clarion)

Assistant coach(es)

- Tony Barbee (UMass)
- Derek Kellogg (UMass)
- John Robic (Denison)

Legend

- (C) Team captain
- (S) Suspended
- (I) Ineligible
- (W) Walk-on
- Injured
- Current redshirt

Roster

== Schedule and results ==
Date time, TV	Rank^{#}	Opponent^{#}	Result	Record	High points	High rebounds	High assists	Site (attendance) city, state
Non-Conference regular season
November 14, 2002*; 7:00 pm, ESPN 2		vs. Syracuse; Coaches vs. Cancer Classic	W 70–63	1–0	19 – Hunt	9 – Carney	7 – Hunt	Madison Square Garden (8,826); New York, New York
November 22, 2002*; 8:00 pm		Austin Peay	L 80–81 ^{OT}	1–1	26 – Barron	10 – Tied	6 – Rice	The Pyramid (16,580); Memphis, Tennessee
November 25, 2002*; 7:00 pm		Arkansas–Pine Bluff	W 78–54	2–1	18 – Barron	10 – Grice	6 – Grice	The Pyramid (14,801); Memphis, Tennessee
December 3, 2002*; 7:00 pm		Arkansas–Little Rock	W 73–49	3–1	21 – Grice	11 – Carney	8 – Burks	The Pyramid (14,994); Memphis, Tennessee
December 7, 2002*; 7:00 pm		Furman	W 72–55	4–1	16 – Grice	10 – Erwin	5 – Wade	The Pyramid (14,991); Memphis, Tennessee
December 14, 2002*; 4:30 pm		at No. 11 Missouri	L 78–93	4–2	22 – Richmond	11 – Grice	5 – Burks	Hearnes Center (12,042); Columbia, Missouri
December 19, 2002*; 8:30 pm		Ole Miss	W 58–51	5–2	14 – Tied	10 – Erwin	6 – Burks	The Pyramid (18,230); Memphis, Tennessee
December 28, 2002*; 5:00 pm		No. 7 Illinois	W 77–74	6–2	16 – Tied	12 – Massie	5 – Burks	The Pyramid (19,268); Memphis, Tennessee
December 30, 2002*; 7:00 pm		Murray State	W 67–60	7–2	19 – Massie	12 – Massie	6 – Hunt	The Pyramid (15,601); Memphis, Tennessee
January 2, 2003*; 7:05 pm		at Arkansas	W 72–67	8–2	16 – Richmond	7 – Tied	2 – Tied	Bud Walton Arena (17,184); Fayetteville, Arkansas
January 5, 2003*; 3:30 pm		Villanova	W 72–68	9–2	23 – Massie	11 – Tied	5 – Richmond	The Pyramid (18,350); Memphis, Tennessee
Conference USA regular season
January 7, 2003; 7:00 pm		Tulane	W 85–73	10–2 (1–0)	34 – Massie	16 – Massie	5 – Grice	The Pyramid (16,167); Memphis, Tennessee
January 11, 2003; 4:00 pm		at Southern Miss	L 67–84	10–3 (1–1)	19 – Massie	10 – Richmond	4 – Rice	Reed Green Coliseum (4,984); Hattiesburg, Mississippi
January 18, 2003; 7:00 pm, UPN 30		South Florida	L 74–75	10–4 (1–2)	22 – Massie	14 – Massie	6 – Hunt	The Pyramid (15,871); Memphis, Tennessee
January 22, 2003; 7:00 pm		Houston	W 77–66	11–4 (2–2)	22 – Massie	16 – Massie	8 – Hunt	The Pyramid (15,142); Memphis, Tennessee
January 25, 2003; 1:10 pm		at St. Louis	L 66–69	11–5 (2–3)	18 – Hunt	5 – Tied	4 – Burks	Savvis Center (9,181); St. Louis, Missouri
February 1, 2003; 1:00 pm		Southern Miss	W 80–62	12–5 (3–3)	16 – Massie	10 – Barron	12 – Burks	The Pyramid (16,351); Memphis, Tennessee
February 4, 2003; 7:00 pm		East Carolina	W 73–49	13–5 (4–3)	22 – Carney	16 – Massie	6 – Burks	The Pyramid (16,006); Memphis, Tennessee
February 8, 2003; 1:00 pm, ESPN+		at TCU	W 84–69	14–5 (5–3)	20 – Grice	11 – Massie	9 – Burks	Daniel–Meyer Coliseum (6,041); Fort Worth, Texas
February 13, 2003; 8:00 pm		at Tulane	W 58–57	15–5 (6–3)	16 – Massie	12 – Massie	4 – Tied	Fogelman Arena (3,155); New Orleans, Louisiana
February 15, 2003; 7:00 pm, UPN 30		UAB; Battle for the Bones	W 94–70	16–5 (7–3)	27 – Burks	12 – Massie	10 – Burks	The Pyramid (17,166); Memphis, Tennessee
February 19, 2003; 6:00 pm, ESPN		at No. 4 Louisville; Rivalry Game	W 80–73	17–5 (8–3)	16 – Burks	11 – Tied	4 – Burks	Freedom Hall (19,786); Louisville, Kentucky
February 22, 2003; 6:00 pm		at South Florida	W 73–66	18–5 (9–3)	16 – Grice	11 – Grice	8 – Burks	Sun Dome (5,808); Tampa, Florida
February 26, 2003; 7:00 pm	No. 24	TCU	W 88–64	19–5 (10–3)	24 – Massie	11 – Massie	10 – Burks	FedEx Forum (16,179); Memphis, Tennessee
March 1, 2003; 8:00 pm, ESPN	No. 24	Cincinnati; Rivalry Game	W 67–48	20–5 (11–3)	23 – Massie	8 – Massie	5 – Rice	The Pyramid (20,586); Memphis, Tennessee
March 6, 2003; 8:30 pm	No. 18	at Houston	W 71–56	21–5 (12–3)	15 – Grice	11 – Barron	7 – Burks	Hofheinz Pavilion (3,542); Houston, Texas
March 8, 2003; 1:00 pm	No. 18	at UAB	W 90–79	22–5 (13–3)	27 – Massie	11 – Massie	12 – Burks	Bartow Arena (5,498); Birmingham, Alabama
Conference USA Tournament
March 13, 2003*; 12:00 pm, ESPN+	No. 16	vs. South Florida; Quarterfinals	W 62–56	23–5	18 – Tied	11 – Massie	8 – Burks	Freedom Hall; Louisville, Kentucky
March 14, 2003*; 4:00 pm, ESPN+	No. 16	at No. 20 Louisville; Semifinals	L 75–78	23–6	29 – Grice	8 – Tied	3 – Burks	Freedom Hall; Louisville, Kentucky
NCAA Tournament
March 20, 2003*; 6:10 pm, CBS	(7 W) No. 19	vs. (10 W) Arizona State; First Round	L 71–84	23–7	20 – Massie	13 – Massie	5 – Burks	Ford Center (18,462); Oklahoma City, Oklahoma
*Non-conference game. (#) Tournament seedings in parentheses. All times are in Central Time, W = West.
