= 2002–03 Xavier Musketeers men's basketball team =

American college basketball season

2002–03 Xavier Musketeers men's basketball

Atlantic 10 Regular season champions

NCAA tournament, second round
- Conference: Atlantic 10 Conference

Ranking
- Coaches: No. 17
- AP: No. 12
- Record: 26–6 (15–1 A10)
- Head coach: Thad Matta (2nd season)
- Home arena: Cintas Center

2002–03 Atlantic 10 men's basketball standings
	Conf.				Overall
Team	W		L	PCT	W		L	PCT
East
Saint Joseph's	12	–	4	.750	23	–	7	.767
Rhode Island	10	–	6	.625	19	–	12	.613
Temple	10	–	6	.625	18	–	16	.529
UMass	6	–	10	.375	11	–	18	.379
Fordham	3	–	13	.188	2	–	26	.071
St. Bonaventure	1	–	15	.063	13	–	14	.481
West
No. 12 Xavier	15	–	1	.938	26	–	6	.813
No. 16 Dayton †	14	–	2	.875	24	–	6	.800
Richmond	10	–	6	.625	15	–	14	.517
La Salle	6	–	10	.375	12	–	17	.414
George Washington	5	–	11	.313	12	–	17	.414
Duquesne	4	–	13	.235	9	–	21	.300
† Atlantic 10 Tournament winner As of February 5, 2016; Rankings from Coaches' Poll

The 2002–03 Xavier Musketeers men's basketball team represented Xavier University from Cincinnati, Ohio, in the 2002–03 season. Led by head coach Thad Matta, the Musketeers finished 26–6 (15–1 A10), and won the Atlantic 10 regular season title, but made an early exit from the Atlantic 10 tournament. In the NCAA tournament, the Musketeers handled Troy State in the opening round before falling to No. 6 seed and defending NCAA champion Maryland in the second round.

== Roster ==
2002–03 Xavier Musketeers men's basketball team
Players
Coaches

Pos.	#	Name	Height	Weight	Year	Hometown
G	0	Lionel Chalmers	6 ft 0 in (1.83 m)	180 lb (82 kg)	Jr	Albany, New York
G	10	Romain Sato	6 ft 5 in (1.96 m)	205 lb (93 kg)	Jr
F	30	David West	6 ft 9 in (2.06 m)	240 lb (109 kg)	Jr
F	24	Anthony Myles	6 ft 9 in (2.06 m)	245 lb (111 kg)	Jr	Chicago, IL
G	12	Dedrick Finn	6 ft 1 in (1.85 m)	180 lb (82 kg)	Fr	Newburgh, IN
G	25	Keith Jackson	6 ft 6 in (1.98 m)	210 lb (95 kg)	So	Cincinnati, OH
F	52	Will Caudle	6 ft 9 in (2.06 m)	240 lb (109 kg)	Fr	Indianapolis, IN
G	13	Dave Young	6 ft 5 in (1.96 m)	200 lb (91 kg)	Sr	New Castle, PA
G	32	Keenan Christiansen	6 ft 4 in (1.93 m)	200 lb (91 kg)	Fr	Greenville, PA
F	40	Angelo Smith	6 ft 9 in (2.06 m)	230 lb (104 kg)	Fr	Indianapolis, IN
F	53	Ryan Caldwell	6 ft 5 in (1.96 m)	245 lb (111 kg)	Sr	Cincinnati, OH
F	21	Anthony Coleman	6 ft 11 in (2.11 m)	240 lb (109 kg)	So	Carson, CA
F	54	Tom Compton	6 ft 11 in (2.11 m)	260 lb (118 kg)	Jr	Cincinnati, OH

Head coach

- Thad Matta (Butler)

Assistant coach(es)

Legend

- (C) Team captain
- (S) Suspended
- (I) Ineligible
- (W) Walk-on
- Injured
- Current redshirt

== Schedule and results ==
Date time, TV	Rank^{#}	Opponent^{#}	Result	Record	Site city, state
Regular season
Nov 18, 2002*	No. 10	Saint Peter's; Preseason NIT	W 87–48	1–0	Cintas Center; Cincinnati, Ohio
Nov 20, 2002*	No. 11	at Stanford; Preseason NIT	L 62–63	1–1	Maples Pavilion; Stanford, California
Nov 24, 2002*	No. 11	Florida A&M	W 93–64	2–1	Cintas Center; Cincinnati, Ohio
Dec 3, 2002*	No. 16	Purdue	W 74–59	3–1	Cintas Center; Cincinnati, Ohio
Dec 7, 2002*	No. 16	at Cincinnati; Crosstown Shootout	W 50–44	4–1	Myrl Shoemaker Center; Cincinnati, Ohio
Dec 9, 2002*	No. 16	Miami (OH)	W 68–58	5–1	Cintas Center; Cincinnati, Ohio
Dec 14, 2002*	No. 13	vs. No. 24 Mississippi State	L 61–71	5–2	Madison Square Garden; New York, New York
Dec 20, 2002*	No. 21	Ball State	W 87–58	6–2	Cintas Center; Cincinnati, Ohio
Dec 23, 2002*	No. 21	at Siena	W 96–88	7–2	Times Union Center; Loudonville, New York
Dec 28, 2002*	No. 24	Eastern Kentucky	W 84–60	8–2	Cintas Center; Cincinnati, Ohio
Dec 31, 2002*	No. 19	No. 15 Creighton	W 75–73	9–2	Cintas Center; Cincinnati, Ohio
Jan 4, 2003*	No. 19	at No. 1 Alabama	L 58–65	9–3	Coleman Coliseum; Tuscaloosa, Alabama
Jan 7, 2003	No. 21	Richmond	L 59–67	9–4 (0–1)	Cintas Center; Cincinnati, Ohio
Jan 11, 2003	No. 21	St. Bonaventure	W 99–83	10–4 (1–1)	Cintas Center; Cincinnati, Ohio
Jan 14, 2003		La Salle	W 80–47	11–4 (2–1)	Cintas Center; Cincinnati, Ohio
Atlantic 10 Tournament
Mar 13, 2003*	No. 10	vs. George Washington; Quarterfinals	W 78–73	25–4	University of Dayton Arena; Dayton, Ohio
Mar 14, 2003*	No. 10	vs. Temple; Semifinals	L 57–63	25–5	University of Dayton Arena; Dayton, Ohio
NCAA Tournament
Mar 21, 2003*	(3 S) No. 12	vs. (14 S) Troy State; First Round	W 71–59	26–5	Gaylord Entertainment Center; Nashville, Tennessee
Mar 23, 2003*	(3 S) No. 12	vs. (6 S) No. 17 Maryland; Second Round	L 64–77	26–6	Gaylord Entertainment Center; Nashville, Tennessee
*Non-conference game. ^{#}Rankings from AP poll. (#) Tournament seedings in parentheses. S=South.

== NBA draft ==
Round	Pick	Player	NBA club
1	18	David West	New Orleans Hornets
