= 2002–03 Saint Joseph's Hawks men's basketball team =

American college basketball season

2002–03 Saint Joseph's Hawks men's basketball
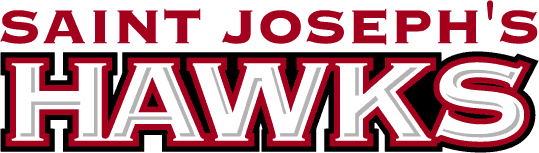

NCAA tournament, first round
- Conference: Atlantic 10
- East
- Record: 23–7 (12–4 Atlantic 10)
- Head coach: Phil Martelli (8th season)
- Assistant coaches: Mark Bass (4th season); Matt Brady (10th season); Monté Ross (7th season)
- Home arena: Alumni Memorial Fieldhouse

2002–03 Atlantic 10 men's basketball standings
	Conf.				Overall
Team	W		L	PCT	W		L	PCT
East
Saint Joseph's	12	–	4	.750	23	–	7	.767
Rhode Island	10	–	6	.625	19	–	12	.613
Temple	10	–	6	.625	18	–	16	.529
UMass	6	–	10	.375	11	–	18	.379
Fordham	3	–	13	.188	2	–	26	.071
St. Bonaventure	1	–	15	.063	13	–	14	.481
West
No. 12 Xavier	15	–	1	.938	26	–	6	.813
No. 16 Dayton †	14	–	2	.875	24	–	6	.800
Richmond	10	–	6	.625	15	–	14	.517
La Salle	6	–	10	.375	12	–	17	.414
George Washington	5	–	11	.313	12	–	17	.414
Duquesne	4	–	13	.235	9	–	21	.300
† Atlantic 10 Tournament winner As of February 5, 2016; Rankings from Coaches' Poll

The 2002–03 Saint Joseph's Hawks men's basketball team represented Saint Joseph's University during the 2002–03 NCAA Division I men's basketball season. Under 8th year head coach Phil Martelli, the Hawks held an overall record of 23–7 and a conference record of 12–4. In the A-10 tournament, Saint Joseph's beat La Salle before falling to Dayton in the semifinals. The Hawks earned an at-large bid to the NCAA tournament – as No. 7 seed in the East region – where they lost in overtime to Auburn in the opening round.

== Roster ==
2002–03 Saint Joseph's Hawks men's basketball team
Players
Coaches

Pos.	#	Name	Height	Weight	Year	Previous school	Hometown
G	5	Dwayne Lee	6 ft 0 in (1.83 m)	180 lb (82 kg)	Fr		Jersey City, NJ
G	10	Phil Martelli Jr.	5 ft 10 in (1.78 m)	155 lb (70 kg)	Sr		Drexel Hill, PA
G	12	Tyrone Barley	6 ft 1 in (1.85 m)	185 lb (84 kg)	Jr		Newark, NJ
G	13	Chet Stachitas	6 ft 5 in (1.96 m)	195 lb (88 kg)	Fr		Ponte Vedra Beach, FL
G	14	Jameer Nelson	6 ft 0 in (1.83 m)	190 lb (86 kg)	Jr	Chester HS	Chester, PA
G	15	Delonte West	6 ft 3 in (1.91 m)	195 lb (88 kg)	So	Eleanor Roosevelt HS	Washington, D.C.
F/C	21	Dwayne Jones	6 ft 11 in (2.11 m)	250 lb (113 kg)	Fr	American Christian School	Morgantown, WV
G	33	Pat Carroll	6 ft 5 in (1.96 m)	190 lb (86 kg)	So	Hatboro-Horsham HS	Pittsburgh, PA
F	34	John Bryant	6 ft 7 in (2.01 m)	220 lb (100 kg)	So		Woodbridge, VA
F	40	Dave Mallon	6 ft 10 in (2.08 m)	240 lb (109 kg)	Fr		East Aurora, NY

Head coach

- Phil Martelli (Widener)

Assistant coach(es)

- Mark Bass (Saint Joseph's)
- Matt Brady (Siena)
- Monté Ross (Winston-Salem State)

Legend

- (C) Team captain
- (S) Suspended
- (I) Ineligible
- (W) Walk-on
- Injured
- Current redshirt

== Schedule and results ==
Date time, TV	Rank^{#}	Opponent^{#}	Result	Record	Site city, state
Regular Season
Nov 23, 2002*		at Boston College	W 85–58	1–0	Silvio O. Conte Forum; Boston, Massachusetts
Nov 26, 2002*		at Canisius	W 70–63	2–0	Koessler Athletic Center; Buffalo, New York
Dec 1, 2002*		Old Dominion	W 63–47	3–0	Hagan Arena; Philadelphia, Pennsylvania
Dec 5, 2002*		Boston University	W 71–49	4–0	Hagan Arena; Philadelphia, Pennsylvania
Dec 7, 2002*		vs. Drexel	W 50–37	5–0	The Palestra; Philadelphia, Pennsylvania
Dec 9, 2002*		Delaware	W 77–59	6–0	Hagan Arena; Philadelphia, Pennsylvania
Dec 21, 2002*		DePaul	W 65–62	7–0	Hagan Arena; Philadelphia, Pennsylvania
Atlantic 10 Tournament
Mar 13, 2003*		vs. La Salle; Quarterfinals	W 68–48	23–5	University of Dayton Arena; Dayton, Ohio
Mar 14, 2003*		at No. 22 Dayton; Semifinals	L 73–76	23–6	University of Dayton Arena; Dayton, Ohio
NCAA Tournament
Mar 21, 2003*	(7 E)	vs. (10 E) Auburn; First Round	L 63–65 ^{OT}	23–7	St. Pete Times Forum; St. Petersburg, Florida
*Non-conference game. ^{#}Rankings from AP Poll. (#) Tournament seedings in parentheses. E=East.
