= 2002–03 Temple Owls men's basketball team =

American college basketball season

2002–03 Temple Owls men's basketball

2003 National Invitation Tournament, Quarterfinal
- Conference: Atlantic 10 Conference
- Record: 18–16 (10–6 A-10)
- Head coach: John Chaney (21st season)
- Assistant coaches: Dan Leibovitz (7th season); Bill Ellerbee (1st season); Mark Macon (1st season)
- Home arena: Liacouras Center

2002–03 Atlantic 10 men's basketball standings
	Conf.				Overall
Team	W		L	PCT	W		L	PCT
East
Saint Joseph's	12	–	4	.750	23	–	7	.767
Rhode Island	10	–	6	.625	19	–	12	.613
Temple	10	–	6	.625	18	–	16	.529
UMass	6	–	10	.375	11	–	18	.379
Fordham	3	–	13	.188	2	–	26	.071
St. Bonaventure	1	–	15	.063	13	–	14	.481
West
No. 12 Xavier	15	–	1	.938	26	–	6	.813
No. 16 Dayton †	14	–	2	.875	24	–	6	.800
Richmond	10	–	6	.625	15	–	14	.517
La Salle	6	–	10	.375	12	–	17	.414
George Washington	5	–	11	.313	12	–	17	.414
Duquesne	4	–	13	.235	9	–	21	.300
† Atlantic 10 Tournament winner As of February 5, 2016; Rankings from Coaches' Poll

The 2002–03 Temple Owls men's basketball team represented Temple University in the 2002–03 NCAA Division I men's basketball season. They were led by head coach John Chaney in his 21st year. The Owls played their home games at the Liacouras Center. The Owls are members of the Atlantic 10 Conference. They finished the season 18–16, 10–6 in A-10 play. The Owls were invited to the 2003 National Invitation Tournament where they beat Drexel, Boston College, and Rhode Island before losing to Minnesota in the quarterfinals.
