= 2003 Northeast Conference men's basketball tournament =

- Classification: Division I
- Season: 2002–03
- Teams: 8
- Site: Spiro Sports Center; Staten Island, NY
- Finals site: Spiro Sports Center; Staten Island, NY
- Champions: Wagner (1st title)
- Winning coach: Dereck Whittenburg (1st title)
- MVP: Jermaine Hall (Wagner)

2002–03 Northeast Conference men's basketball standings
	Conf.				Overall
Team	W		L	PCT	W		L	PCT
Wagner †	14	–	4	.778	21	–	11	.656
Monmouth	13	–	5	.722	15	–	13	.536
Central Connecticut	12	–	6	.667	15	–	13	.536
Quinnipiac	10	–	8	.556	17	–	12	.586
Saint Francis (PA)	10	–	8	.556	14	–	14	.500
St. Francis (NY)	9	–	9	.500	14	–	16	.467
Fairleigh Dickinson	9	–	9	.500	15	–	14	.517
Long Island	7	–	11	.389	9	–	19	.321
Robert Morris	7	–	11	.389	10	–	17	.370
Mount St. Mary's	6	–	12	.333	11	–	16	.407
Sacred Heart	6	–	12	.333	8	–	21	.276
UMBC	5	–	13	.278	7	–	20	.259
† 2003 NEC tournament winner

The 2003 Northeast Conference men's basketball tournament was held in March. The tournament featured the league's top eight seeds. Wagner won the championship, its first, and received the conference's automatic bid to the 2003 NCAA Tournament.

== Format ==
The NEC Men’s Basketball Tournament consisted of an eight-team playoff format with the quarterfinal and semifinal games played at the Spiro Sports Center in Staten Island, NY. The Championship game was played at the court of the highest remaining seed, Wagner.

== Bracket ==
Quarterfinals; Spiro Sports Center
1	Wagner	88
8	Long Island	66
4	Quinnipiac	75
5	Saint Francis (PA)	57
2	Monmouth	61
7	Fairleigh Dickinson	63
3	Central Connecticut	62
6	St. Francis (NY)	67

Semifinals; Spiro Sports Center
1	Wagner	61
4	Quinnipiac	54
7	Fairleigh Dickinson	66
6	St. Francis (NY)	88

Championship Game; Spiro Sports Center
1	Wagner	78
6	St. Francis (NY)	61

== All-tournament team ==
Tournament MVP in bold.

**2003 NEC All-Tournament Team**

**Jermaine Hall**, WAGNER
Rashaun Banjo, QU
John Quintana, SFNY
Dedrick Dye, WAGNER
Courtney Pritchard, WAGNER
