= 2002–03 Dayton Flyers men's basketball team =

American college basketball season

2002–03 Dayton Flyers men's basketball
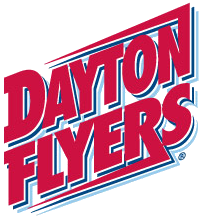

Atlantic 10 tournament champions

NCAA tournament, first round
- Conference: Atlantic 10 Conference

Ranking
- Coaches: No. 25
- AP: No. 16
- Record: 24–6 (14–2 A-10)
- Head coach: Oliver Purnell (9th season)
- Assistant coaches: Ron Jirsa; Frank Smith; Josh Postorino
- Home arena: University of Dayton Arena

2002–03 Atlantic 10 men's basketball standings
	Conf.				Overall
Team	W		L	PCT	W		L	PCT
East
Saint Joseph's	12	–	4	.750	23	–	7	.767
Rhode Island	10	–	6	.625	19	–	12	.613
Temple	10	–	6	.625	18	–	16	.529
UMass	6	–	10	.375	11	–	18	.379
Fordham	3	–	13	.188	2	–	26	.071
St. Bonaventure	1	–	15	.063	13	–	14	.481
West
No. 12 Xavier	15	–	1	.938	26	–	6	.813
No. 16 Dayton †	14	–	2	.875	24	–	6	.800
Richmond	10	–	6	.625	15	–	14	.517
La Salle	6	–	10	.375	12	–	17	.414
George Washington	5	–	11	.313	12	–	17	.414
Duquesne	4	–	13	.235	9	–	21	.300
† Atlantic 10 Tournament winner As of February 5, 2016; Rankings from Coaches' Poll

The 2002–03 Dayton Flyers men's basketball team represented the University of Dayton during the 2002–03 NCAA Division I men's basketball season. The Flyers, led by ninth year head coach Oliver Purnell, played their home games at the University of Dayton Arena and were members of the Atlantic 10 Conference. They finished the season 24–6, 13–2 in A-10 play, with both losses coming to regular season champion Xavier. They won the program's first Atlantic 10 tournament title after defeating Temple in the championship game. Dayton received the A-10's automatic bid to the NCAA tournament where they were upset by Tulsa in the first round. Following the season, Purnell accepted the head coaching position at Clemson. He was replaced by Brian Gregory.

== Previous season ==
The 2001-02 Dayton Flyers finished the season with an overall record of 21–12, with a record of 10–6 in the Atlantic 10 regular season. The Flyers fell to Xavier in the semifinals of the Atlantic 10 tournament. They received a bid to play in the NIT where they defeated Detroit in the opening round before falling to Tennessee Tech in the first round.

== Offseason ==
=== Departures ===
Name	Number	Pos.	Height	Weight	Year	Hometown	Notes
David Morris	1	G	5'10"	185	Senior	Laurel, MD	Graduated
Yuanta Holland	23	F	6'7"	225	Senior	Dayton, OH	Graduated
Sammy Smith	30	G	6'5"	205	Sophomore	Worthington, OH	Transferred to Capital University

=== Incoming transfers ===
Name	Number	Pos.	Height	Weight	Year	Hometown	Previous School
Frank Iguodala	42	F	6'5"	205	Junior	Springfield, IL	Junior college transfer from Lake Land College

== Incoming recruits ==
College recruiting information
Name	Hometown	School	Height	Weight	Commit date
Marques Bennett; F	Indianapolis, IN	Brebeuf Jesuit Prep	6 ft 4 in (1.93 m)	190 lb (86 kg)	Jul 8, 2003
Marques Bennett; F	Recruit ratings: Scout: Rivals: (N/A)				
James Cripe; F	Loveland, OH	Loveland High School	6 ft 10 in (2.08 m)	220 lb (100 kg)	Jul 8, 2003
James Cripe; F	Recruit ratings: Scout: Rivals: (N/A)				
Monty Scott; F	Reynoldsburg, OH	Reynoldsburg High School	6 ft 6 in (1.98 m)	215 lb (98 kg)	Jul 8, 2003
Monty Scott; F	Recruit ratings: Scout: Rivals: (N/A)				
Logan White; G	Chagrin Falls, OH	University High School	6 ft 4 in (1.93 m)	167 lb (76 kg)	Jul 8, 2003
Logan White; G	Recruit ratings: Scout: Rivals: (N/A)				
Warren Williams; G	Gaithersburg, MD	DeMatha High School	6 ft 1 in (1.85 m)	180 lb (82 kg)	Jul 8, 2003
Warren Williams; G	Recruit ratings: Scout: Rivals: (N/A)				
Overall recruit ranking:
Note: In many cases, Scout, Rivals, 247Sports, On3, and ESPN may conflict in their listings of height and weight.; In these cases, the average was taken. ESPN grades are on a 100-point scale.; Sources: "2002 Team Ranking". Rivals.

== Roster ==
2002–03 Dayton Flyers men's basketball team
Players
Coaches

Pos.	#	Name	Height	Weight	Year	Previous school	Hometown
G	2	D.J. Stelly	6 ft 4 in (1.93 m)	193 lb (88 kg)	Sr	Aurora	Aurora, CO
G	3	Ramod Marshall	6 ft 2 in (1.88 m)	180 lb (82 kg)	Jr	Garinger	Charlotte, NC
F	5	Nate Green	6 ft 6 in (1.98 m)	245 lb (111 kg)	RS Sr	Laurel Baptist Academy	Laurel, MD
G	11	Warren Williams	6 ft 1 in (1.85 m)	180 lb (82 kg)	Fr	DeMatha	Gaithersburg, MD
G	13	Greg Kohls (W)	6 ft 2 in (1.88 m)	167 lb (76 kg)	Sr	Centerville	Centerville, OH
G	14	Mark Jones	6 ft 1 in (1.85 m)	180 lb (82 kg)	So	Norwich	Taftville, CT
G	15	Logan White	6 ft 4 in (1.93 m)	190 lb (86 kg)	Fr	University	Cleveland, OH
G/F	22	Marques Bennett	6 ft 4 in (1.93 m)	200 lb (91 kg)	Fr	Brebeuf Jesuit	Indianapolis, IN
G/F	33	Brooks Hall	6 ft 6 in (1.98 m)	205 lb (93 kg)	Sr	Troy	Dayton, OH
F	42	Frank Iguodala	6 ft 5 in (1.96 m)	210 lb (95 kg)	Jr	Lanphier/Lake Land College	Springfield, IL
F	45	Keith Waleskowski	6 ft 9 in (2.06 m)	228 lb (103 kg)	Jr	Alter	Dayton, OH
C	54	Sean Finn	7 ft 0 in (2.13 m)	240 lb (109 kg)	Jr	Hays	Hays, KS
C		James Cripe (redshirt)	7 ft 0 in (2.13 m)	250 lb (113 kg)	Fr	Loveland	Loveland, OH
F		Monty Scott (redshirt)	6 ft 6 in (1.98 m)	230 lb (104 kg)	Fr	Reynoldsburg	Reynoldsburg, OH

Head coach

- Oliver Purnell (Old Dominion)

Assistant coach(es)

- Ron Jirsa (Gettysburg)
- Frank Smith (Old Dominion)
- Josh Postorino (Dayton)

Legend

- (C) Team captain
- (S) Suspended
- (I) Ineligible
- (W) Walk-on
- Injured
- Current redshirt

== Schedule ==
Date time, TV	Rank^{#}	Opponent^{#}	Result	Record	Site (attendance) city, state
Non-conference regular season
11/24/2002*		Delaware State	W 65–38	1–0	UD Arena (11,770); Dayton, OH
11/27/2002*		Evansville	W 64–59	2–0	UD Arena (11,176); Dayton, OH
11/30/2002*		No. 21 Cincinnati	W 75–69	3–0	UD Arena (13,409); Dayton, OH
12/4/2002*		at Miami	L 63–78	3–1	Millett Hall (5,112); Oxford, OH
12/7/2002*		UNC Wilmington	W 59–48	4–1	UD Arena (11,888); Dayton, OH
12/14/2002*		at Saint Louis	L 55–63	4–2	Savvis Center (8,448); St. Louis, MO
12/17/2002*		Ball State	W 80–65	5–2	UD Arena (11,598); Dayton, OH
12/20/2002*		at Old Dominion	W 71–67	6–2	Ted Constant Convocation Center (5,532); Norfolk, VA
12/22/2002*		Villanova	W 80–78	7–2	UD Arena (12,375); Dayton, OH
12/29/2002*		at No. 3 Duke	L 74-85	7–3	Cameron Indoor Stadium (9,314); Durham, NC
1/04/2003*		No. 13 Marquette	W 92–85 ^{ot}	8–3	UD Arena (12,037); Dayton, OH
Atlantic 10 regular season
01/08/2003		La Salle	W 76–72	9–3 (1–0)	UD Arena (12,289); Dayton, OH
01/11/2003		Duquesne	W 77–72	10–3 (2–0)	UD Arena (12,489); Dayton, OH
01/15/2003		Richmond	W 66-53	11–3 (3–0)	UD Arena (12,105); Dayton, OH
01/18/2003		at George Washington	W 71–61	12–3 (4–0)	Charles E. Smith Center (4,102); Washington, D.C.
01/25/2003		at Temple	W 57-49	13–3 (5–0)	Liacouras Center (5,793); Philadelphia, PA
01/29/2003		Massachusetts	W 83–55	14–3 (6–0)	UD Arena (12,000); Dayton, OH
02/01/2003		at La Salle	W 75-70	15–3 (7–0)	Tom Gola Arena (3,520); Philadelphia, PA
02/05/2003		at Duquesne	W 76-75	16–3 (8–0)	Palumbo Center (4,004); Pittsburgh, PA
02/08/2003		at No. 20 Xavier; Blackburn/McCafferty Trophy	L 77-85	16–4 (8–1)	Cintas Center (10,250); Cincinnati, OH
02/12/2003		George Washington	W 87–68	17–4 (9–1)	UD Arena (12,811); Dayton, OH
02/15/2003		No. 25 Saint Joseph's	W 66–56	18–4 (10–1)	UD Arena (13,409); Dayton, OH
02/19/2003	No. 25	at Richmond	W 70-63	19–4 (11–1)	Robins Center (4,129); Richmond, VA
02/22/2003	No. 25	No. 14 Xavier; Blackburn/McCafferty Trophy	L 72-73	19–5 (11–2)	UD Arena (13,409); Dayton, OH
02/26/2003	No. 25	at Rhode Island	W 82-70	20–5 (12–2)	Ryan Center (5,903); Kingston, RI
03/01/2003	No. 25	Fordham	W 69-64	21–5 (13–2)	UD Arena (13,409); Dayton, OH
03/05/2003		St. Bonaventure	W 1-0	22-5 (14-2)	UD Arena; Dayton, OH
Atlantic 10 tournament
03/13/2003	No. 22	Rhode Island; Quarterfinals	W 74–57	22–5	UD Arena (10,897); Dayton, OH
03/14/2003	No. 22	No. 25 Saint Joseph's; Semifinals	W 76-73	23-5	UD Arena (11,648); Dayton, OH
03/15/2003	No. 22	Temple; Championship Game	W 79-72	24-5	UD Arena (11,537); Dayton, OH
NCAA tournament
03/20/2003*	(4 MW) No. 16	(13 MW) Tulsa; First Round	L 71-84	24-6	Spokane Veterans Memorial Arena (11,171); Spokane, WA
*Non-conference game. ^{#}Rankings from AP Poll. (#) Tournament seedings in parentheses. All times are in Eastern Time.
