= 2003 Atlantic 10 men's basketball tournament =

- Classification: Division I
- Season: 2002–03
- Teams: 11
- Site: University of Dayton Arena; Dayton, Ohio
- Champions: Dayton (1st title)
- Winning coach: Oliver Purnell (1st title)
- MVP: Ramod Marshall (Dayton)

2002–03 Atlantic 10 men's basketball standings
	Conf.				Overall
Team	W		L	PCT	W		L	PCT
East
Saint Joseph's	12	–	4	.750	23	–	7	.767
Rhode Island	10	–	6	.625	19	–	12	.613
Temple	10	–	6	.625	18	–	16	.529
UMass	6	–	10	.375	11	–	18	.379
Fordham	3	–	13	.188	2	–	26	.071
St. Bonaventure	1	–	15	.063	13	–	14	.481
West
No. 12 Xavier	15	–	1	.938	26	–	6	.813
No. 16 Dayton †	14	–	2	.875	24	–	6	.800
Richmond	10	–	6	.625	15	–	14	.517
La Salle	6	–	10	.375	12	–	17	.414
George Washington	5	–	11	.313	12	–	17	.414
Duquesne	4	–	13	.235	9	–	21	.300
† Atlantic 10 Tournament winner As of February 5, 2016; Rankings from Coaches' Poll

The 2003 Atlantic 10 men's basketball tournament was played from March 10 to March 15, 2003. The winner was named champion of the Atlantic 10 Conference and received an automatic bid to the 2003 NCAA Men's Division I Basketball Tournament. Dayton won the tournament and got the conference's automatic bid to the NCAA Tournament. Xavier and Saint Joseph's also received bids to the NCAA Tournament. Rhode Island, Richmond and Temple received bids to the 2003 National Invitation Tournament. Ramod Marshall of Dayton was named the tournament's Most Outstanding Player. Future NBA players Jameer Nelson of Saint Joseph's and David West of Xavier were among those joining Marshall on the All-Championship Team.

== Format ==
The tournament was a single-elimination tournament. Seeding was determined by the regular season standings in each division. With the conference divided into East and West divisions, the top two teams in each division received a first-round bye.

St. Bonaventure was forced to forfeit its six conference wins after forward Jamil Terrell was declared academically ineligible. The Atlantic 10 also barred the Bonnies from participating in the conference tournament. The Bonnies would have been the fourth seed from the East Division. However, with their banishment from the tournament, West Division #3 seed Richmond automatically got a first round bye.

The first round was played at the home arena of the higher seed. The remaining games were played at the University of Dayton Arena in Dayton, Ohio.

== Bracket ==
First round Monday, March 10
W4	La Salle	74
E5	Fordham	62
E3	Rhode Island	75
W6	Duquesne	73
E4	UMass	74
W5	George Washington	85

Quarterfinals; Thursday, March 13
E1	#25 Saint Joseph's	68
W4	La Salle	48
W2	#22 Dayton	74
E3	Rhode Island	57
W1	#10 Xavier	78
W5	George Washington	73
E2	Temple	66
W3	Richmond	52

Semifinals; Friday, March 14
E1	#25 Saint Joseph's	73
W2	#22 Dayton	76
W1	#10 Xavier	57
E2	Temple	63

Final; Saturday, March 15
W2	#22 Dayton	79
E2	Temple	73
