= Burt Kahn Court =

Multi-purpose arena in Hamden, Connecticut

Coordinates: 41.4214°N 72.8953°W

Burt Kahn Court is a 2,000-seat multi-purpose arena in Hamden, Connecticut. It was the home of the Quinnipiac University Bobcats basketball team from 1969 to 2006 until the TD Bank Sports Center was opened. The Bobcats held a 254–184 record while playing at the facility. It is the current home of Bobcats volleyball. The facility was renovated in 2002, with new scoreboards and a new wood surface being added.

The Court is named after Burt Kahn, a former basketball coach and athletic director at Quinnipiac.
