= 2003 NCAA Division I men's basketball tournament =

Edition of USA college basketball tournament

- Season: 2002–03
- Teams: 65
- Finals site: Louisiana Superdome, New Orleans, Louisiana
- Champions: Syracuse Orangemen (1st title, 3rd title game, 4th Final Four)
- Runner-up: Kansas Jayhawks (7th title game, 12th Final Four)
- Semifinalists: Marquette Golden Eagles (3rd Final Four); Texas Longhorns (3rd Final Four)
- Winning coach: Jim Boeheim (1st title)
- MOP: Carmelo Anthony (Syracuse)
- Attendance: 54,524
- Top scorer: Carmelo Anthony (Syracuse) (121 points)

The 2003 NCAA Division I men's basketball tournament involved 65 schools playing in single-elimination play to determine the national champion of men's NCAA Division I college basketball. The 65th annual edition of the tournament began on March 18, 2003, and ended with the championship game on April 7, in New Orleans, Louisiana, at the Louisiana Superdome. A total of 64 games were played.

The Final Four consisted of Kansas, making its second straight appearance; Marquette, making its first appearance since they won the national championship in 1977; Syracuse, making its first appearance since 1996; and Texas, making its first appearance since 1947. Texas was the only top seed to advance to the Final Four; the other three (Arizona, Kentucky, and Oklahoma) advanced as far as the Elite Eight but fell.

Syracuse won its first national championship in three tries under 27th-year head coach Jim Boeheim, who would ultimately retire after the 2022–2023 season. This was also Roy Williams’s final game as Kansas head coach; he would depart after the season to become head coach at North Carolina.

Carmelo Anthony of Syracuse was named the tournament's Most Outstanding Player.

Syracuse beat four Big 12 teams on its way to the title: Oklahoma State, Oklahoma, Texas, and Kansas.

== Schedule and venues ==
2003 play-in game (orange) and first and second rounds (green)
2003 Regionals (blue) and Final Four (red)

The following are the sites that were selected to host each round of the 2003 tournament:

Opening Round

- March 18
  - University of Dayton Arena, Dayton, Ohio (Host: University of Dayton)

First and Second Rounds

- March 20 and 22
  - Ford Center, Oklahoma City, Oklahoma (Host: Big 12 Conference)
  - Jon M. Huntsman Center, Salt Lake City, Utah (Host: University of Utah)
  - RCA Dome, Indianapolis, Indiana (Hosts: Butler University and Horizon League)
  - Spokane Veterans Memorial Arena, Spokane, Washington (Host: Washington State University)
- March 21 and 23
  - BJCC Arena, Birmingham, Alabama (Host: Southeastern Conference)
  - FleetCenter, Boston, Massachusetts (Host: Boston College)
  - Gaylord Entertainment Center, Nashville, Tennessee (Host: Vanderbilt University)
  - St. Pete Times Forum, Tampa, Florida (Host: University of South Florida)

Regional semifinals and finals (Sweet Sixteen and Elite Eight)

- March 27 and 29
  - Midwest Regional
    - Hubert H. Humphrey Metrodome, Minneapolis, Minnesota (Host: University of Minnesota)
  - West Regional
    - Arrowhead Pond of Anaheim, Anaheim, California (Host: Big West Conference)
- March 28 and 30
  - East Regional
    - Pepsi Arena, Albany, New York (Host: Metro Atlantic Athletic Conference and Siena College)
  - South Regional
    - Alamodome, San Antonio, Texas (Host: University of Texas at San Antonio)

National semifinals and championship (Final Four and championship)

- April 5 and 7
  - Louisiana Superdome, New Orleans, Louisiana (Host: Sun Belt Conference and University of New Orleans)

== Qualifying teams ==
=== Automatic bids ===
The following teams were automatic qualifiers for the 2003 NCAA field by virtue of winning their conference's tournament (except for the Ivy League, whose regular-season champion received the automatic bid).

Conference	School	Appearance	Last bid
ACC	Duke	27th	2002
America East	Vermont	1st	Never
Atlantic 10	Dayton	12th	2000
Atlantic Sun	Troy State	1st	Never
Big 12	Oklahoma	22nd	2002
Big East	Pittsburgh	15th	2002
Big Sky	Weber State	13th	1999
Big South	UNC Asheville	1st	Never
Big Ten	Illinois	23rd	2002
Big West	Utah State	15th	2001
Colonial	UNC Wilmington	3rd	2002
C-USA	Louisville	30th	2000
Horizon	UW–Milwaukee	1st	Never
Ivy League	Penn	20th	2002
MAAC	Manhattan	5th	1995
MAC	Central Michigan	4th	1987
MEAC	South Carolina State	5th	2000
Mid-Con	IUPUI	1st	Never
Missouri Valley	Creighton	14th	2002
Mountain West	Colorado State	8th	1990
Northeast	Wagner	1st	Never
Ohio Valley	Austin Peay	5th	1996
Pac-10	Oregon	8th	2002
Patriot	Holy Cross	11th	2002
SEC	Kentucky	45th	2002
Southern	East Tennessee State	6th	1992
Southland	Sam Houston State	1st	Never
Sun Belt	Western Kentucky	19th	2002
SWAC	Texas Southern	4th	1995
WAC	Tulsa	14th	2002
West Coast	San Diego	3rd	1987

=== Listed by region and seeding ===
East Regional – Albany
Seed	School	Conference	Record	Berth Type
#1	Oklahoma	Big 12	24–6	Automatic
#2	Wake Forest	ACC	24–5	At-large
#3	Syracuse	Big East	24–5	At-large
#4	Louisville	C-USA	24–6	Automatic
#5	Mississippi State	SEC	20–10	At-large
#6	Oklahoma State	Big 12	21–9	At-large
#7	Saint Joseph's	Atlantic 10	23–6	At-large
#8	California	Pac-10	21–8	At-large
#9	North Carolina State	ACC	18–12	At-large
#10	Auburn	SEC	20–11	At-large
#11	Pennsylvania	Ivy League	22–5	Automatic
#12	Butler	Horizon	25–5	At-large
#13	Austin Peay	OVC	23–7	Automatic
#14	Manhattan	MAAC	23–6	Automatic
#15	East Tennessee State	Southern	20–10	Automatic
#16	South Carolina State	MEAC	20–10	Automatic

Midwest Regional – Minneapolis
Seed	School	Conference	Record	Berth Type
#1	Kentucky	SEC	29–3	Automatic
#2	Pittsburgh	Big East	26–4	Automatic
#3	Marquette	C-USA	23–5	At-large
#4	Dayton	Atlantic 10	24–5	Automatic
#5	Wisconsin	Big Ten	22–7	At-large
#6	Missouri	Big 12	21–10	At-large
#7	Indiana	Big Ten	20–12	At-large
#8	Oregon	Pac-10	23–9	Automatic
#9	Utah	Mountain West	24–7	At-large
#10	Alabama	SEC	17–11	At-large
#11	Southern Illinois	Missouri Valley	24–6	At-large
#12	Weber State	Big Sky	26–5	Automatic
#13	Tulsa	WAC	22–9	Automatic
#14	Holy Cross	Patriot	26–4	Automatic
#15	Wagner	Northeast	21–10	Automatic
#16	IUPUI	Mid-Continent	20–13	Automatic

South Regional – San Antonio
Seed	School	Conference	Record	Berth Type
#1	Texas	Big 12	22–6	At-large
#2	Florida	SEC	24–7	At-large
#3	Xavier	Atlantic 10	25–5	At-large
#4	Stanford	Pac-10	23–8	At-large
#5	Connecticut	Big East	21–9	At-large
#6	Maryland	ACC	19–9	At-large
#7	Michigan State	Big Ten	19–12	At-large
#8	LSU	SEC	21–10	At-large
#9	Purdue	Big Ten	18–10	At-large
#10	Colorado	Big 12	20–11	At-large
#11	UNC Wilmington	CAA	24–6	Automatic
#12	BYU	Mountain West	23–8	At-large
#13	San Diego	WCC	18–11	Automatic
#14	Troy State	Atlantic Sun	26–5	Automatic
#15	Sam Houston State	Southland	23–6	Automatic
#16	UNC Asheville	Big South	14–16	Automatic
#16	Texas Southern	SWAC	18–12	Automatic

West Regional – Anaheim
Seed	School	Conference	Record	Berth Type
#1	Arizona	Pac-10	25–3	At-large
#2	Kansas	Big 12	25–7	At-large
#3	Duke	ACC	24–6	Automatic
#4	Illinois	Big Ten	24–6	Automatic
#5	Notre Dame	Big East	22–9	At-large
#6	Creighton	Missouri Valley	29–4	Automatic
#7	Memphis	C-USA	23–6	At-large
#8	Cincinnati	C-USA	17–11	At-large
#9	Gonzaga	WCC	23–8	At-large
#10	Arizona State	Pac-10	19–11	At-large
#11	Central Michigan	Mid-American	24–6	Automatic
#12	UW–Milwaukee	Horizon	24–7	Automatic
#13	Western Kentucky	Sun Belt	24–8	Automatic
#14	Colorado State	Mountain West	19–13	Automatic
#15	Utah State	Big West	24–8	Automatic
#16	Vermont	America East	21–11	Automatic

=== BYU bracketing switch ===
When the bracket was first revealed, it contained a mistake that would have forced BYU, a Mormon-run school, to play its potential Elite 8 game on a Sunday, which is against school policy. As a solution, the selection committee had a plan to switch BYU, the 12 seed in the Friday-Sunday South regional, with the team that reached the Sweet 16 in the Thursday-Saturday Midwest regional (either Wisconsin, Weber State, Dayton, or Tulsa) should the Cougars advance to the Sweet 16. BYU lost its first-round game to Connecticut, which meant no switches were necessary.

== Bids by conference ==
Bids by Conference
Bids	Conference(s)
6	Big 12, SEC
5	Big Ten, Pac-10
4	ACC, Big East, C-USA
3	Atlantic 10, Mountain West
2	Horizon, Missouri Valley, WCC
1	19 others

== Final Four ==
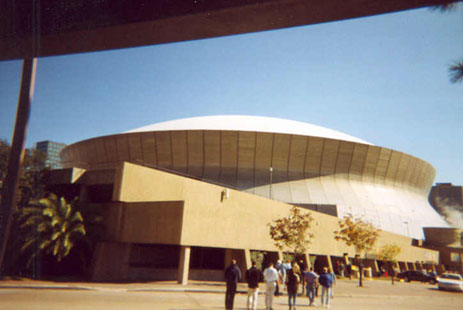
The Louisiana Superdome was host of the Final Four and National Championship in 2003.

At Louisiana Superdome, New Orleans

=== National semifinals ===
- April 5, 2003
  - Syracuse (E3) 95, Texas (S1) 84
  Freshman Carmelo Anthony scored 33 points leading the Syracuse Orangemen past the Texas Longhorns in the night cap of the national semifinal doubleheader. Syracuse opened up a comfortable 2nd half lead, but that was trimmed to four with just 1:08 remaining. However, freshman Gerry McNamara iced the game with clutch foul shooting in the final minutes. The win put Syracuse and coach Jim Boeheim one win away from their first ever National Championship. Texas was the last number one seed remaining in the tournament.
  - Kansas (W2) 94, Marquette (M3) 61
  The Kansas Jayhawks routed the Marquette Golden Eagles by 33 points, the fourth largest blowout in Final Four history. Keith Langford led the Jayhawks with 24 points, and Kirk Hinrich and Aaron Miles each added 18 points. Dwyane Wade led Marquette in scoring with 19 points in the loss. Like Boeheim, Kansas coach Roy Williams was just one win away from winning his first ever National Championship.

=== Championship game ===
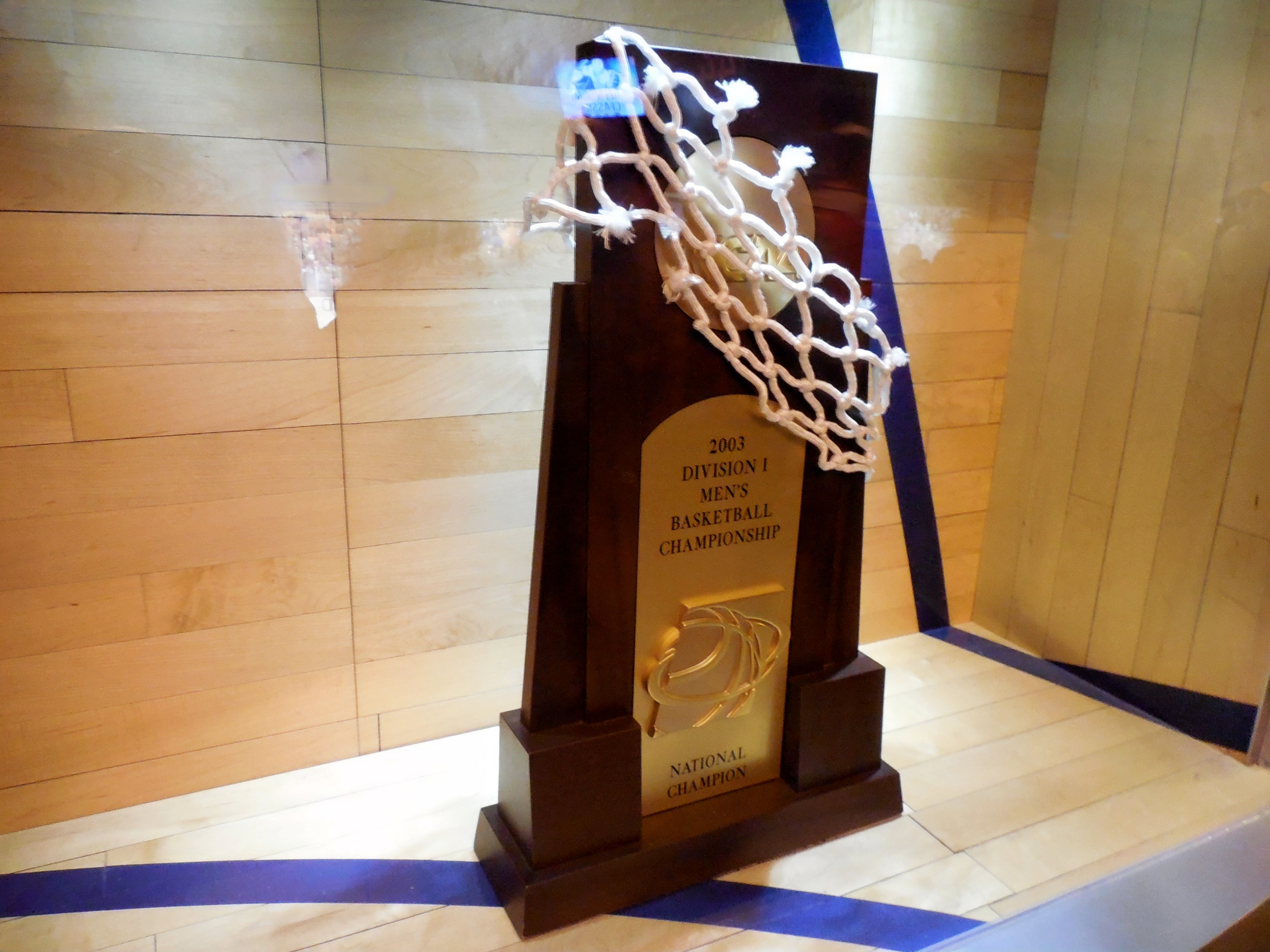
2003 NCAA Men's Basketball National Championship Trophy

- April 7, 2003
  - Syracuse (E3) 81, Kansas (W2) 78
  Leading up to the championship game, much of the conversation revolved around how, no matter the outcome, one of the well-known head coaches would win their first championship. In Jim Boeheim's 27 years as head coach at Syracuse his team had been to two previous Final Fours, and finished runner-up each time (1987, 1996). Roy Williams, during his fifteen seasons as Kansas head coach, had reached the Final Four three previous times, and finished runner up once (1991). Syracuse dominated with a hot shooting first half to lead by 11 at the break. Gerry McNamara connected on an impressive six three-pointers in the half, which were his 18 points for the game. Kansas fought back to within 80–78 in the final minute and had a chance to tie after Hakim Warrick missed a pair of free throws in the final moments; free throws were a major problem throughout the game for Kansas, who went 12-for-30 in attempts. Warrick then blocked Michael Lee's three point attempt with 1.5 seconds remaining on the game clock, followed by Kirk Hinrich's three-pointer at the buzzer going over the net. Kansas' free throw struggles would prove costly in giving Syracuse and Jim Boeheim their first ever national championship. Carmelo Anthony was named Most Outstanding Player (MOP) with 20 points and 10 Rebounds in the win. Syracuse also avenged a second-round loss to Kansas two years earlier.

== Bracket ==
=== Opening Round game ===
Winner advances to 16th seed in South Regional vs. (1) Texas.

Opening Round game March 18
16a	UNC Asheville	92^{OT}
16b	Texas Southern	84

=== East Regional – Albany, New York ===
First round
1	Oklahoma	71
16	South Carolina State	54
Oklahoma City - Thu/Sat
8	California	76^{OT}
9	NC State	74
5	Mississippi St	46
12	Butler	47
Birmingham - Fri/Sun
4	Louisville	86
13	Austin Peay	64
6	Oklahoma State	77
11	Pennsylvania	63
Boston - Fri/Sun
3	Syracuse	76
14	Manhattan	65
7	Saint Joseph's	63
10	Auburn	65^{OT}
Tampa - Fri/Sun
2	Wake Forest	76
15	East Tennessee State	73

Quarter-finals
1	Oklahoma	74
8	California	65
12	Butler	79
4	Louisville	71
6	Oklahoma State	56
3	Syracuse	68
10	Auburn	68
2	Wake Forest	62

Regional semifinals
1	Oklahoma	65
12	Butler	54
3	Syracuse	79
10	Auburn	78

Regional Finals
1	Oklahoma	47
3	Syracuse	63

=== South Regional – San Antonio, Texas ===
First round
1	Texas	82
16	UNC Asheville	61
Birmingham - Fri/Sun
8	LSU	56
9	Purdue	80
5	Connecticut	58
12	BYU	53
Spokane - Thu/Sat
4	Stanford	77
13	San Diego	69
6	Maryland	75
11	UNC Wilmington	73
Nashville - Fri/Sun
3	Xavier	71
14	Troy State	59
7	Michigan State	79
10	Colorado	64
Tampa - Fri/Sun
2	Florida	85
15	Sam Houston State	55

Quarter-finals
1	Texas	77
9	Purdue	67
5	Connecticut	85
4	Stanford	74
6	Maryland	77
3	Xavier	64
7	Michigan State	68
2	Florida	46

Regional semifinals
1	Texas	82
5	Connecticut	78
6	Maryland	58
7	Michigan State	60

Regional Finals
1	Texas	85
7	Michigan State	76

=== Midwest Regional – Minneapolis, Minnesota ===
First round
1	Kentucky	95
16	IUPUI	64
Nashville - Fri/Sun
8	Oregon	58
9	Utah	60
5	Wisconsin	81
12	Weber State	74
Spokane - Thu/Sat
4	Dayton	71
13	Tulsa	84
6	Missouri	72
11	Southern Illinois	71
Indianapolis - Thu/Sat
3	Marquette	72
14	Holy Cross	68
7	Indiana	67
10	Alabama	62
Boston - Fri/Sun
2	Pittsburgh	87
15	Wagner	61

Quarter-finals
1	Kentucky	74
9	Utah	54
5	Wisconsin	61
13	Tulsa	60
6	Missouri	92
3	Marquette	101^{OT}
7	Indiana	52
2	Pittsburgh	74

Regional semifinals
1	Kentucky	63
5	Wisconsin	57
3	Marquette	77
2	Pittsburgh	74

Regional Finals
1	Kentucky	69
3	Marquette	83

=== West Regional – Anaheim, California ===
First round
1	Arizona	80
16	Vermont	51
Salt Lake City - Thu/Sat
8	Cincinnati	69
9	Gonzaga	74
5	Notre Dame	70
12	Milwaukee	69
Indianapolis - Thu/Sat
4	Illinois	65
13	Western Kentucky	60
6	Creighton	73
11	Central Michigan	79
Salt Lake City Thu/Sat
3	Duke	67
14	Colorado State	57
7	Memphis	71
10	Arizona State	84
Oklahoma City - Thu/Sat
2	Kansas	64
15	Utah State	61

Quarter-finals
1	Arizona	96^{2OT}
9	Gonzaga	95
5	Notre Dame	68
4	Illinois	60
11	Central Michigan	60
3	Duke	86
10	Arizona State	76
2	Kansas	108

Regional semifinals
1	Arizona	88
5	Notre Dame	71
3	Duke	65
2	Kansas	69

Regional Finals
1	Arizona	75
2	Kansas	78

=== Final Four – New Orleans, Louisiana ===
National semifinals
E3	Syracuse	95
S1	Texas	84
M3	Marquette	61
W2	Kansas	94

National Championship Game
E3	Syracuse	81
W2	Kansas	78

== Broadcast information ==
Originally, CBS Sports was to have shown all 63 games of the tournament following the opening round, which was on ESPN. However, because of the start of the Iraq War the night before, the afternoon games on Thursday and Friday were moved to ESPN while retaining CBS graphics and production. CBS News then joined other broadcast and non-broadcast outlets in showing extended news coverage.

Thursday and Friday night's games were shown on CBS, albeit with frequent news updates. To make up for lost advertising revenue, an additional time slot was opened the following Sunday evening for more CBS telecasts.

2003 also marked the debut of Mega March Madness as an exclusive package on DirecTV. This offered additional game broadcasts not available to the viewer's home market during the first three rounds of the tournament. All games from the 4th round (Elite Eight) onward were national telecasts.

Westwood One had exclusive national radio coverage.

=== CBS Sports announcers ===
- Jim Nantz/Billy Packer/Bonnie Bernstein – First & Second Round at Nashville, Tennessee; West Regional at Anaheim, California; Final Four at New Orleans, Louisiana
- Dick Enberg/Matt Guokas/Kareem Abdul-Jabbar/Armen Keteyian – First & Second Round at Salt Lake City, Utah; South Regional at San Antonio, Texas
- Verne Lundquist/Bill Raftery/Lesley Visser – First & Second Round at Boston, Massachusetts; Midwest Regional at Minneapolis, Minnesota
- Gus Johnson/Len Elmore/Solomon Wilcots – First & Second Round at Indianapolis, Indiana; East Regional at Albany, New York
- Kevin Harlan/Jay Bilas/Dwayne Ballen – First & Second Round at Oklahoma City, Oklahoma
- Ian Eagle/Jim Spanarkel/Darren Horton – First & Second Round at Tampa, Florida
- Craig Bolerjack/Dan Bonner/Brett Haber – First & Second Round at Birmingham, Alabama
- Tim Brando/Bob Wenzel/Leslie Maxie – First & Second Round at Spokane, Washington

=== Westwood One announcers ===
==== First and second rounds ====
Doug Kennedy and Richard Larsen

== See also ==
- 2003 NCAA Division II men's basketball tournament
- 2003 NCAA Division III men's basketball tournament
- 2003 NCAA Division I women's basketball tournament
- 2003 NCAA Division II women's basketball tournament
- 2003 NCAA Division III women's basketball tournament
- 2003 National Invitation Tournament
- 2003 Women's National Invitation Tournament
- 2003 NAIA Division I men's basketball tournament
