= 2002–03 Big East Conference men's basketball season =

American college basketball season

2002–03 Big East Conference Men's Basketball Season
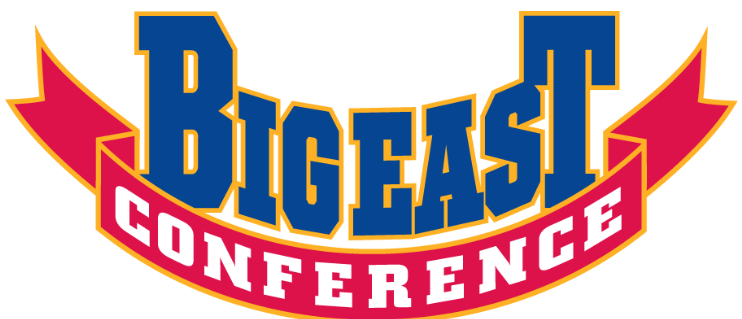
- League: NCAA Division I
- Sport: Basketball
- Duration: November 14, 2002 through March 15, 2003
- Teams: 14
- TV partner: ESPN

Regular Season
- Champion: Boston College and Connecticut (East, 10–6); Pittsburgh and Syracuse (West, 13–3)
- Season MVP: Troy Bell – Boston College

Tournament
- Champions: Pittsburgh
- Finals MVP: Julius Page – Pittsburgh

Basketball seasons
- 2001–02 2003–04

2002–03 Big East men's basketball standings
	Conf.				Overall
Team	W		L	PCT	W		L	PCT
East
Boston College	10	–	6	.625	19	–	12	.613
No. 23 Connecticut	10	–	6	.625	23	–	10	.697
Providence	8	–	8	.500	18	–	14	.563
Villanova	8	–	8	.500	15	–	16	.484
St. John's#	7	–	9	.438	1	–	13	.071
Miami	4	–	12	.250	11	–	17	.393
Virginia Tech*	4	–	12	.250	11	–	18	.379
West
No. 13 Syracuse	13	–	3	.813	30	–	5	.857
No. 4 Pittsburgh†	13	–	3	.813	28	–	5	.848
Seton Hall	10	–	6	.625	17	–	13	.567
No. 22 Notre Dame	10	–	6	.625	24	–	10	.706
Georgetown	6	–	10	.375	19	–	15	.559
West Virginia	5	–	11	.313	14	–	15	.483
Rutgers*	4	–	12	.250	12	–	16	.429
† 2003 Big East tournament winner As of March 31, 2003; Rankings from AP Poll #St. John's had 20 regular-season games vacated due to sanctions against the program; the school′s disputed record was 7–9, 21–13. *Did not qualify for 2003 Big East tournament.

The 2002–03 Big East Conference men's basketball season was the 24th in conference history, and involved its 14 full-time member schools.

Boston College and Connecticut were the regular-season co-champions of the East Division with identical records of 10–6, and Pittsburgh and Syracuse were co-champions of the West Division with identical records of 13–3. Pittsburgh won the Big East tournament championship.

Syracuse won the national championship, and St. John's won the 2003 National Invitation Tournament.

== Season summary & highlights ==
- For the third and final season, the Big East used a divisional structure with an East Division and a West Division, each composed of seven teams. The conference scrapped its divisions and moved to a unitary structure the following season.
- Boston College and Connecticut were the East Division regular-season co-champions with identical records of 10–6. It was Boston College's fifth regular-season championship or co-championship and third division championship or co-championship. (Note: Under an earlier Big East divisional structure Boston College won a Big East 6 Division co-championship in the 1996–97 season, and it also won the East Division title outright in the 2000–01 season.) It was Connecticut's eighth regular-season championship or co-championship and fourth division championship or co-championship. (Note: Under an earlier Big East divisional structure Connecticut won two outright Big East 6 Division championships, in the 1995–96 and 1997–98 season, and it also won the East Division title outright in the 2001–02 season.)
- Pittsburgh and Syracuse were the regular-season co-champions of the West Division. It was Pittsburgh's fourth conference championship or co-championship and second division championship or co-championship. It was Syracuse's eighth conference championship or co-championship and second division championship or co-championship. (Note: Under an earlier Big East divisional structure Syracuse won an outright Big East 7 Division championship in the 1997–98 season.)
- Pittsburgh won its first Big East tournament championship.
- Syracuse won its first national championship.
- Syracuse freshman forward Carmelo Anthony was both the top scorer and Most Outstanding Player of the 2003 NCAA Tournament.
- St. John's won the 2003 National Invitation Tournament, defeating Georgetown in the final. The following season, however, St. John's vacated 20 victories this season and its NIT championship due to sanctions imposed on the program because of the use of an ineligible player.
- St. John's senior guard Marcus Hatten was named Most Valuable Player of the 2003 NIT, but Hatten's award also was vacated the following season.

== Head coaches ==
School	Coach	Season	Notes
Boston College	Al Skinner	6th	
Connecticut	Jim Calhoun	17th	
Georgetown	Craig Esherick	5th	
Miami	Perry Clark	3rd	
Notre Dame	Mike Brey	3rd	
Pittsburgh	Ben Howland	4th	Resigned April 3, 2003
Providence	Tim Welsh	5th	
Rutgers	Gary Waters	2nd	
St. John's	Mike Jarvis	5th	
Seton Hall	Louis Orr	2nd	Big East Coach of the Year
Syracuse	Jim Boeheim	27th	
Villanova	Jay Wright	2nd	
Virginia Tech	Ricky Stokes	4th	Fired March 10, 2003
West Virginia	John Beilein	1st	

== Rankings ==
Pittsburgh was ranked in the Associated Press poll Top 10 all season, reaching as high as No. 2 and finishing the season as No. 4. Connecticut, Notre Dame, and Syracuse also spent time in the AP Top 25 and were ranked in it at the end of the season.

2002–03 Big East Conference Weekly Rankings Key: ██ Increase in ranking. ██ Decrease in ranking.
AP Poll	Pre	11/18	11/25	12/2	12/9	12/16	12/23	12/30	1/6	1/13	1/20	1/27	2/3	2/10	2/17	2/24	3/3	3/10	Final
Boston College																			
Connecticut	15	14	12	11	9	8	6	5	3	6	11	14	18	23					23
Georgetown																			
Miami																			
Notre Dame					10	9	8	6	5	10	16	11	10	10	12	9	16	17	22
Pittsburgh	5	5	5	5	4	4	2	2	6	3	2	2	4	7	9	8	7	5	4
Providence																			
Rutgers																			
St. John's																			
Seton Hall																			
Syracuse										25		24	19	17	15	15	12	11	13
Villanova																			
Virginia Tech																			
West Virginia																			

== Regular-season statistical leaders ==
Scoring
Name	School	PPG
Troy Bell	BC	25.2
Michael Sweetney	GU	22.8
Marcus Hatten	SJU	22.2
Carmelo Anthony	Syr	22.2
Drew Schifino	WVU	20.1

Rebounding
Name	School	RPG
Emeka Okafor	Conn	11.2
Michael Sweetney	GU	10.4
Carmelo Anthony	Syr	10.0
Ryan Gomes	Prov	9.7
Hakim Warrick	Syr	8.5

Assists
Name	School	APG
Chris Thomas	ND	6.9
Brandin Knight	Pitt	6.3
Andre Barrett	SHU	5.3
Taliek Brown	Conn	4.8
Ben Gordon	Conn	4.7

Steals
Name	School	SPG
Marcus Hatten	SJU	2.9
Troy Bell	BC	2.3
Gerry McNamara	Syr	2.2
Brandin Knight	Pitt	2.1
Jerome Coleman	RU	1.9

Blocks
Name	School	BPG
Emeka Okafor	Conn	4.7
Michael Sweetney	GU	3.2
Marcus Douthit	Prov	3.0
Herve Lamizana	RU	3.0
Jeremy McNeil	Syr	2.9

Field Goals
Name	School	FG%
Craig Smith	BC	.603
Emeka Okafor	Conn	.580
Michael Sweetney	GU	.547
Hakim Warrick	Syr	.541
Ryan Gomes	Prov	.537

3-Pt Field Goals
Name	School	3FG%
Gary Buchanan	Vill	.409
Matt Carroll	ND	.407
Troy Bell	BC	.402
Jerome Coleman	RU	.295
No other qualifiers

Free Throws
Name	School	FT%
Gerry McNamara	Syr	.909
Chris Thomas	ND	.871
Troy Bell	BC	.847
Matt Carroll	ND	.844
Gerald Riley	GU	.843

== Postseason ==
=== Big East tournament ===
==== Seeding ====
Two teams — the seventh-place finishers in each division based on conference record, after the application of tiebreakers as necessary — did not qualify for the Big East Tournament. The remaining six teams in each division were seeded No. 1 through No. 6 by division based on conference record, again applying tiebreakers as necessary. Four teams — the No. 1 and No. 2 seeds in each division — received a bye into the quarterfinal round. Eight teams — the No. 3 through No. 6 seeds in each division — played in the first round. In the first round the No. 3 East seed played the No. 6 West seed, the No. 4 East seed played the No. 5 West seed, the No. 5 East seed played the No. 4 West seed, and the No. 6 East seed played the No. 3 West seed.

Seeding in the East Division was (1) Boston College, (2) Connecticut, (3) Providence, (4) Villanova, (5) St. John's, and (6) Miami. Seeding in the West Division was (1) Syracuse, (2) Pittsburgh, (3) Seton Hall, (4) Notre Dame, (5) Georgetown, and (6) West Virginia. The two seventh-place finishers that did not qualify for the tournament were Virginia Tech in the East Division and Rutgers in the West Division.

==== Bracket ====
First round March 12, 2003
W5	Georgetown	46
E4	Villanova	41
E6	Miami	52
W3	Seton Hall	67
E5	St. John's	83
W4	#17 Notre Dame	80
W6	West Virginia	50
E3	Providence	73

Quarterfinals; March 13, 2003
W1	#11 Syracuse	74
W5	Georgetown	69
E2	Connecticut	83
W3	Seton Hall	70
E1	Boston College	82*
E5	St. John's	75
W2	#5 Pittsburgh	67
E3	Providence	57

Semifinals; March 14, 2003
W1	#11 Syracuse	67
E2	Connecticut	80
E1	Boston College	48
W2	#5 Pittsburgh	61

Championship Game; March 15, 2003
E2	Connecticut	56
W2	#5 Pittsburgh	74

=== NCAA tournament ===
Four Big East teams received bids to the NCAA Tournament. Connecticut, Notre Dame, and Pittsburgh lost in the regional semifinals. Syracuse won the national championship. Syracuse freshman forward Carmelo Anthony scored 121 points during the tournament and was both its top scorer and Most Outstanding Player.

School	Region	Seed	Round 1	Round 2	Sweet 16	Elite 8	Final Four	Final
Syracuse	East	3	14 Manhattan, W 76–65	6 Oklahoma State, W 68–56	10 Auburn, W 79–78	1 Oklahoma, W 63–47	S1 Texas, W 95–84	W2 Kansas, W 81–78
Pittsburgh	Midwest	2	15 Wagner, W 87–61	7 Indiana, W 74–52	3 Marquette, L 77–74			
Connecticut	South	5	12 BYU, W 58–53	4 Stanford, W 85–74	1 Texas, L 82–78			
Notre Dame	West	5	12 Milwaukee, W 70–69	4 Illinois, W 68–60	1 Arizona, L 88–71			

=== National Invitation Tournament ===
Six Big East teams received bids to the National Invitation Tournament, which did not yet have seeding. They played in three of the tournament's four unnamed brackets. Villanova lost in the opening round and Boston College and Seton Hall in the first round. Georgetown defeated Providence in a second-round game. St. John's won the tournament championship, defeating Georgetown in the final.

The following season, St. John's center Abe Keita revealed that a member of the team's staff had paid him nearly $300 a month for the past four seasons, making him ineligible to play. As a result, St. John's took various actions, including vacating 43 wins in which Keita participated, among them the team's victories and eventual championship in the 2003 NIT. St. John's became the third team in the history of the NIT to be forced to vacate its standing in the tournament. St. John's senior guard Marcus Hatten was named the 2003 NIT's tournament Most Valuable Player, but this award also was vacated.

School	Opening round	Round 1	Round 2	Quarterfinals	Semifinals	Final
~~St. John's~~	Bye	Boston University, W 73–57	Virginia, W 73–63	UAB, W 79–71	Texas Tech, W 64–63	Georgetown, W 70–67
Georgetown	Bye	Tennessee, W 70–60	Providence, W 67–58	North Carolina, W 79–74	Minnesota, W 88–74	~~St. John's~~, L 70–67
Providence	Richmond, W 67–49	College of Charleston, W 69–64	Georgetown, L 67–58			
Seton Hall	Bye	Rhode Island, L 61–60				
Boston College	Fairfield, W 90–78	Temple, L 75–62				
Villanova	Siena, L 74–59					

== Awards and honors ==
=== Big East Conference ===
Player of the Year:

- Troy Bell, Boston College, G Sr.

Defensive Player of the Year:

- Emeka Okafor, Connecticut, C, So.

Rookie of the Year:

- Carmelo Anthony, Syracuse, F, Fr.

Most Improved Player:

- Hakim Warrick, Syracuse, F, So.

Coach of the Year:

- Louis Orr, Seton Hall (2nd season)

All-Big East First Team

- Troy Bell, Boston College, G Sr., 6 ft 1 in (185 cm), 180 lb (82 kg), Minneapolis, Minn.
- Carmelo Anthony, Syracuse, F, Fr., 6 ft 8 in (203 cm), 230 lb (104 kg), New York, N.Y.
- Emeka Okafor, Connecticut, C, So., 6 ft 10 in (208 cm), 252 lb (114 kg), Houston, Tex.
- Michael Sweetney, Georgetown, F Jr., 6 ft 8 in (203 cm), 275 lb (125 kg), Oxon Hill, Md.
- Marcus Hatten, St. John's, G Sr., 6 ft 1 in (185 cm), 165 lb (75 kg), Baltimore, Md.
- Matt Carroll, Notre Dame, G Sr., 6 ft 6 in (198 cm), 212 lb (96 kg), Horsham, Pa.

All-Big East Second Team:

- Brandin Knight, Pittsburgh, G Sr., 6 ft 0 in (183 cm), 180 lb (82 kg), East Orange, N.J.
- Andre Barrett, Seton Hall, G Jr., 5 ft 10 in (178 cm), 172 lb (78 kg), The Bronx, N.Y.
- Ryan Gomes, Providence, F, So., 6 ft 7 in (201 cm), 250 lb (113 kg), Waterbury, Conn.
- Craig Smith, Boston College, F, Fr., 6 ft 7 in (201 cm), 250 lb (113 kg), Inglewood, Calif.
- Chris Thomas, Notre Dame, G, So., 6 ft 1 in (185 cm), 190 lb (86 kg), Indianapolis, Ind.
- Ben Gordon, Connecticut, G, So., 6 ft 3 in (191 cm), 200 lb (91 kg), Mount Vernon, N.Y.

All-Big East Third Team:

- Chevon Troutman, Pittsburgh, F, So., 6 ft 7 in (201 cm), 240 lb (109 kg), Williamsport, Pa.
- Julius Page, Pittsburgh, G Jr., 6 ft 3 in (191 cm), 191 lb (87 kg), Buffalo, N.Y.
- Darius Rice, Miami, F Jr., 6 ft 10 in (208 cm), 222 lb (101 kg), Jackson, Miss.
- Hakim Warrick, Syracuse, F, So., 6 ft 9 in (206 cm), 219 lb (99 kg), Philadelphia, Pa.
- Drew Schifino, West Virginia, F, So., 6 ft 3 in (191 cm), 215 lb (98 kg), Pittsburgh, Pa.

Big East All-Rookie Team:

- Craig Smith, Boston College, F, Fr., 6 ft 7 in (201 cm), 250 lb (113 kg), Inglewood, Calif.
- Torin Francis, Notre Dame, F, Fr., 6 ft 11 in (211 cm), 252 lb (114 kg), Boston, Mass.
- Donnie McGrath, Providence, G, Fr., 6 ft 4 in (193 cm), 190 lb (86 kg), Katonah, N.Y.
- Kelly Whitney, Seton Hall, F, Fr., 6 ft 8 in (203 cm), 240 lb (109 kg), Chicago, Ill.
- Carmelo Anthony, Syracuse, F, Fr., 6 ft 8 in (203 cm), 230 lb (104 kg), New York, N.Y.
- Gerry McNamara, Syracuse, G, Fr., 6 ft 2 in (188 cm), 182 lb (83 kg), Scranton, Pa.
- Kevin Pittsnogle, West Virginia, C, Fr., 6 ft 11 in (211 cm), 255 lb (116 kg), Martinsburg, W.Va.

=== All-Americans ===
The following players were selected to the 2003 Associated Press All-America teams.

Consensus All-America Second Team:

- Carmelo Anthony, Syracuse, Key Stats: 22.2 ppg, 10.0 rpg, 2.2 apg, 1.6 spg, 45.3 FG%, 33.7 3P%, 778 points
- Troy Bell, Boston College, Key Stats: 25.2 ppg, 4.6 rpg, 3.7 apg, 2.3 spg, 44.1 FG%, 40.2 3P%, 781 points

Second Team All-America:

- Carmelo Anthony, Syracuse, Key Stats: 22.2 ppg, 10.0 rpg, 2.2 apg, 1.6 spg, 45.3 FG%, 33.7 3P%, 778 points
- Troy Bell, Boston College, Key Stats: 25.2 ppg, 4.6 rpg, 3.7 apg, 2.3 spg, 44.1 FG%, 40.2 3P%, 781 points

AP Honorable Mention

- Matt Carroll, Notre Dame
- Brandin Knight, Pittsburgh
- Emeka Okafor, Connecticut
- Michael Sweetney, Georgetown
- Chris Thomas, Notre Dame

== See also ==
- 2002–03 NCAA Division I men's basketball season
- 2002–03 Connecticut Huskies men's basketball team
- 2002–03 Georgetown Hoyas men's basketball team
- 2002–03 Notre Dame Fighting Irish men's basketball team
- 2002–03 Pittsburgh Panthers men's basketball team
- 2002–03 St. John's Red Storm men's basketball team
- 2002–03 Syracuse Orangemen basketball team
