= 2002–03 Pittsburgh Panthers men's basketball team =

American college basketball season

2002–03 Pittsburgh Panthers men's basketball

Big East Regular Season West co-champions Big East tournament champions

NCAA tournament, Sweet Sixteen
- Conference: Big East Conference (1979–2013)

Ranking
- Coaches: No. 8
- AP: No. 4
- Record: 28–5 (13–3 Big East)
- Head coach: Ben Howland (4th season)
- Assistant coaches: Jamie Dixon (4th season); Barry Rohrssen (2nd season); Ernie Zeigler (2nd season)
- Home arena: Petersen Events Center (Capacity: 12,508)

2002–03 Big East men's basketball standings
	Conf.				Overall
Team	W		L	PCT	W		L	PCT
East
Boston College	10	–	6	.625	19	–	12	.613
No. 23 Connecticut	10	–	6	.625	23	–	10	.697
Providence	8	–	8	.500	18	–	14	.563
Villanova	8	–	8	.500	15	–	16	.484
St. John's#	7	–	9	.438	1	–	13	.071
Miami	4	–	12	.250	11	–	17	.393
Virginia Tech*	4	–	12	.250	11	–	18	.379
West
No. 13 Syracuse	13	–	3	.813	30	–	5	.857
No. 4 Pittsburgh†	13	–	3	.813	28	–	5	.848
Seton Hall	10	–	6	.625	17	–	13	.567
No. 22 Notre Dame	10	–	6	.625	24	–	10	.706
Georgetown	6	–	10	.375	19	–	15	.559
West Virginia	5	–	11	.313	14	–	15	.483
Rutgers*	4	–	12	.250	12	–	16	.429
† 2003 Big East tournament winner As of March 31, 2003; Rankings from AP Poll #St. John's had 20 regular-season games vacated due to sanctions against the program; the school′s disputed record was 7–9, 21–13. *Did not qualify for 2003 Big East tournament.

The 2002–03 Pittsburgh Panthers men's basketball team represented the University of Pittsburgh in the 2002–03 NCAA Division I men's basketball season. This was Pitt's first season playing in the Petersen Events Center. Led by head coach Ben Howland, the Panthers finished with a record of 28–5 and battled their way to the Sweet Sixteen of the 2003 NCAA Division I men's basketball tournament. Following the season, Coach Howland left to become head coach of UCLA.

== Roster ==
2002–03 Pittsburgh Panthers men's basketball team
Players
Coaches

Pos.	#	Name	Height	Weight	Year	Hometown
G	0	Carlo Dorazio	6 ft 0 in (1.83 m)	173 lb (78 kg)	Jr	Plum, Pennsylvania
G	1	Julius Page	6 ft 3 in (1.91 m)	191 lb (87 kg)	Jr	Buffalo, New York
F	2	Chevon Troutman	6 ft 7 in (2.01 m)	240 lb (109 kg)	So	Williamsport, Pennsylvania
G	3	Yuri Demetris	6 ft 4 in (1.93 m)	220 lb (100 kg)	So	Glenshaw, Pennsylvania
G	4	Jaron Brown	6 ft 4 in (1.93 m)	229 lb (104 kg)	Jr	Lexington, Kentucky
F	5	Donatas Zavackas	6 ft 8 in (2.03 m)	238 lb (108 kg)	Sr	Lithuania
G	11	Carl Krauser	6 ft 2 in (1.88 m)	200 lb (91 kg)	Fr	Bronx, New York
G	20	Brandin Knight	6 ft 0 in (1.83 m)	180 lb (82 kg)	Sr	East Orange, New Jersey
F	21	Mark McCarroll	6 ft 11 in (2.11 m)	220 lb (100 kg)	So	Queens, New York
G	23	Gino Federico	6 ft 5 in (1.96 m)	215 lb (98 kg)	Jr	McKees Rocks, Pennsylvania
F/C	50	Ontario Lett	6 ft 6 in (1.98 m)	265 lb (120 kg)	Sr	Pensacola, Florida
C	55	Toree Morris	6 ft 10 in (2.08 m)	282 lb (128 kg)	Jr	Oliver Springs, Tennessee

Head coach

Ben Howland

Assistant coach(es)

- Jamie Dixon
- Barry Rohrssen
- Ernie Zeigler

Legend

- (C) Team captain
- (S) Suspended
- (I) Ineligible
- (W) Walk-on
- Injured
- Current redshirt

Roster
Last update: June 6, 2020

== Tournament results ==
=== Big East tournament ===
3/13/03 @ Madison Square Garden, New York, NY Vs. Providence W, 67–59
3/14/03 @ Madison Square Garden, New York, NY Vs. Boston College W, 61–48
3/15/03 @ Madison Square Garden, New York, NY Vs. Connecticut W, 74–56

=== NCAA tournament ===
3/21/03 @ TD Garden, Boston, MA Vs. Wagner W, 87–61
3/23/03 @ TD Garden, Boston, MA Vs. Indiana W, 74–51
3/27/03 @ Metrodome, Minneapolis, MN Vs. Marquette L, 74–77
