= Julius Page =

American basketball player

Personal information
- Born: February 26, 1982 (age 44) Buffalo, New York
- Listed height: 6 ft 3 in (1.91 m)
- Listed weight: 191 lb (87 kg)

Career information
- High school: Turner-Carroll (Buffalo, New York)
- College: Pittsburgh (2000–2004)
- NBA draft: 2004: undrafted
- Playing career: 2004–2009
- Position: Point guard / shooting guard

Career history
- 2005: Idaho Stampede
- 2006–2008: Bnei Hasharon
- 2008: Giants Nördlingen

Career highlights
- Third-team All-Big East (2003); Big East tournament MVP (2003)

Julius Marvin Page (born February 26, 1982) is an American former professional basketball player. An athletic combo guard whose vertical leap was reported to be 39 inches (0.99 m), he played high school basketball at Turner-Carroll High School in Buffalo, New York. He then played college basketball with the Pittsburgh Panthers, staying for 4 years: in his junior season in 2003 he was named Big East tournament MVP and was a third-team all-conference selection. After going undrafted in the 2004 NBA draft, Page started a professional career in the Continental Basketball Association, playing for the Idaho Stampede. He has also played in Germany and Israel before retiring from professional basketball in 2009.

== High school career ==
Page played for Turner-Carroll High School, a Catholic school in the East Side of his hometown of Buffalo, New York. As a sophomore, Page was selected as a starter of the varsity team, and the school won the Class C state championship. In his junior year, he averaged 22 points, 6 rebounds and 4 assists per game, and his team won the Class B state title; he was named in the All-Western New York First Team at the end of the season.

In his senior year, Page averaged 25 points, 11 rebounds and 4 assists per game, winning the 2000 Buffalo News Player of the Year award for the best player in the Western New York area. He was also included in the all-area first team for the second consecutive season. The Pittsburgh Post-Gazette mentioned him as one of the best players in the nation, and he was considered one of the most athletic players and one of the best dunkers in the 2000 class by the Sporting News. Page was selected to play in the Capital Classic, a high school all-star game, during which he scored 15 points, shooting 7/11 from the field. During Page's tenure at Turner-Carroll, the school appeared in three state championships, winning two. He ended his high school career with a total of 1,541 points.

== College career ==
=== Freshman season ===
Page was recruited by Clemson, Notre Dame, Pittsburgh and Villanova, and committed to Pittsburgh in early September 1999. Newly appointed head coach Ben Howland signed Page intending to use him as a shooting guard in his lineup, replacing departing seniors Kellii Taylor and Jarrett Lockhart. Page chose to wear jersey number 1 and was included in the starting lineup since mid-December, starting 25 consecutive games as a freshman. On January 20, 2001, Page scored 18 points (a then season high) against Georgetown: during the game, he dunked on Georgetown center Ruben Boumtje-Boumtje, in a dunk that was defined as one of the best in Pittsburgh history by Kevin Gorman of the Pittsburgh Tribune-Review and one of the best in NCAA college basketball history by Paul Ables of Bleacher Report. On February 3, in a game against of Notre Dame, Page tied his season high mark of 18 points. During the 2001 National Invitation Tournament, Page scored a new season high of 22 points against St. Bonaventure. Throughout the season, Page made an impact on his team with his shooting and his defense. He was the second best scorer on the team behind senior forward Ricardo Greer at 9.1 points per game, and the fifth best in three-point shooting percentage at 34.1 (on 3.8 attempts per game). Page also played a total of 888 minutes (26.9 per game), ranking fourth on the team.

=== Sophomore season ===
Page was confirmed as the team's starting shooting guard for his sophomore season. In the game against Illinois State on November 24, 2001, Page posted a career-high 6 assists. On January 5, in a game against Boston College, Page recorded a career-high 3 blocks. He scored a then career-high 23 points on March 2, 2002, against West Virginia in the last game of the regular season. In the Big East tournament, Page played 48 minutes during the double overtime loss to UConn. During the 2002 NCAA tournament, Page debuted with 16 points (4/6 on three-pointers) on March 15 against Central Connecticut State, followed by a 17-point, 8-rebound performance against California, recording a career high in rebounds in a single game. In the Sweet Sixteen game against Kent State, Page scored 18 points in a 73–78 loss. Page was the second-best scorer on the team behind point guard Brandin Knight (12.2 points per game), second in minutes per game (34.3) and third in assists (2.2), and he had his best free throw shooting season at 80.9%. At the end of the season he was an All-Big East Honorable Mention.

=== Junior season ===
As a junior, Page debuted on November 23, 2002, in the first game of the season against Duquesne, scoring 17 points. In the game against Ohio State on December 18 he scored 18 points. He scored a career-high 25 points on January 18, 2003, against future NCAA champions Syracuse, shooting 10/15 from the field, making 4 of his 8 three-point attempts. He then scored 19 points against Notre Dame (February 9), 17 points against UConn (March 2), and 16 points against Seton Hall (March 5) and Boston College (March 14). In the Big East championship game (the third consecutive in Page's career) against UConn, Page scored 16 points (7/13 from the field, including 2/4 from three) and added 4 steals, 3 rebounds and 2 assists in 36 minutes. He won the Dave Gavitt Trophy as the Big East tournament MVP, and was a third-team All-Conference selection, leading the Panthers in scoring in conference play (12.4 points per game).

In the 2003 NCAA tournament Page made his debut posting 9 points, 3 rebounds and 4 assists against Wagner; he then scored 13 points against Indiana, shooting 5/9 from the field. The team reached the Sweet Sixteen, where they were eliminated by Marquette: Page scored 12 points and recorded 4 assists in the last game. Page ended the season as the team's top scorer (12.2 points per game) in a balanced offense that saw 5 players average at least 10 points per game. Page also ranked second in minutes per game (32.1), third in assists (2.2 behind Knight's 6.3 and Carl Krauser's 2.9) and shot a career-best 37% from three on 4.6 attempts per game. Page was a candidate for the Dapper Dan Sportsman of the Year award for the Pittsburgh area, and was selected to the USBWA and NABC All-District teams.

=== Senior season ===
Page opted to return to Pittsburgh for his senior year. In the preseason, he was included in the list of 50 preliminary candidates for the John R. Wooden award. He was selected as team co-captain together with Jaron Brown and Toree Morris. His senior season was characterized by an ankle injury that bothered Page all season long. Nevertheless, Page played a career-high 1,281 minutes over 36 games, all starts. He sometimes shared point guard duties with Carl Krauser, in addition to his usual role of shooting guard. Page was one of the main contributors on the team, scoring double figures in 21 games. Pittsburgh won the Big East regular season title, and advanced to the semifinals in the Big East tournament, losing in the title game against UConn, 58–61, with Page scoring 2 points in 35 minutes. Pittsburgh qualified again for the NCAA Tournament: in the 2004 edition he made his debut against UCF on March 19, posting 10 points and 5 rebounds; he then scored 12 points against Wisconsin on March 21, and 5 in the loss to Oklahoma State on March 25. He ranked second on the team in minutes per game (a career-high 35.6), third in scoring (11 points per game, behind Krauser and Brown), fourth in assists and fourth in steals. At the end of the season he was named in the All-Big East Honorable Mention list, and in the USBWA and NABC All-District teams.

Page ended his career at Pittsburgh with 1,512 total points, ranking 17th in program history as of 2019. He reached the 1,000 point milestone in 96 games. Throughout his career he was noted for his athleticism and dunks, and for often wearing a t-shirt with only one sleeve (the right one) under his jersey.

== Professional career ==
After the end of his college career, Page played at the Portsmouth Invitational Tournament in April, playing for the same team as Andre Barrett and Marcus Douthit. He went undrafted in the 2004 NBA draft, and on February 21, 2005, he decided to sign with the Idaho Stampede, a team that played in the Continental Basketball Association (CBA). Page played 6 games during the 2004–05 CBA season, averaging 5.5 points, 1.2 rebounds and 1.8 assists in 16.2 minutes per game.

In 2006, Page joined Israeli club Bnei Hasharon. He debuted with the new team on the 4th round of the 2006–07 Super League season against Hapoel Jerusalem, scoring 9 points in 19 minutes. On the 27th round against Maccabi Giv'at Shmuel, the last game he played in the season, Page scored 28 points in 35 minutes, scoring 7/8 on 2-point field goals and 4/6 on three-pointers; in that game he also recorded 8 rebounds and 5 steals. Page stayed with the club for the following season, playing 9 games: he made his season debut in the first game against Ironi Ramat Gan scoring 4 points in 14 minutes. He recorded a season-high 6 points against Maccabi Rishon LeZion on the 7th round. He played his last game with Bnei Hasharon on the 10th round of the season, against Ironi Ramat Gan, playing only 2 minutes.

Page moved to Germany and signed with Giants Nördlingen, a team of the Basketball Bundesliga. He played 1 minute and 32 seconds on September 20, 2008, against EnBW Ludwigsburg, recording no stats. Page was then selected by the Colorado 14ers in the 6th round of the 2008 NBA Development League draft (95th overall), but he did not stay with the club, being waived on November 20, 2008.

== Career statistics ==
=== Domestic leagues ===
==== Regular season ====
Season	Team	League	GP	GS	MPG	FG%	3P%	FT%	RPG	APG	SPG	BPG	PPG
2005	Idaho Stampede	CBA	6	0	16.2	.389	.267	.500	1.2	1.8	0.3	0.0	5.5
2006–07	Bnei Hasharon	BSL	19	1	12.4	.648	.556	.571	2.4	1.0	0.8	0.1	5.1
2007–08	Bnei Hasharon	BSL	9	1	7.9	.333	.182	.667	0.7	0.3	0.2	0.0	2.0
2009	Giants Nördlingen	BBL	1	0	1.5	.000	.000	.000	0.0	0.0	0.0	0.0	0.0

==== Playoffs ====
Season	Team	League	GP	GS	MPG	FG%	3P%	FT%	RPG	APG	SPG	BPG	PPG
2007	Bnei Hasharon	BSL	2	0	22.0	.400	.333	.750	4.0	1.5	0.5	0.0	6.5

=== College ===
Year	Team	GP	GS	MPG	FG%	3P%	FT%	RPG	APG	SPG	BPG	PPG
2000–01	Pittsburgh	33	25	26.9	.424	.341	.623	1.8	1.1	0.7	0.2	9.1
2001–02	Pittsburgh	35	35	34.3	.466	.313	.809	3.6	2.2	0.5	0.5	12.2
2002–03	Pittsburgh	32	32	32.1	.488	.370	.700	3.4	2.2	0.8	0.3	12.2
2003–04	Pittsburgh	36	36	35.6	.371	.329	.706	2.9	1.8	0.7	0.4	11.0
Career		136	128	32.3	.435	.337	.711	3.0	1.8	0.6	0.3	11.1

== Personal life ==
Page was born to Garrett Flakes and Selina Page in Buffalo, New York. His father was a former basketball player at Point Park University and Concord University; Page was named Julius after Julius Erving, a former AAU teammate of his father. Other sources like NBA.com and the Pittsburgh Panthers website also report that his mother went into labor while his father was at a basketball game. Page has six siblings: four brothers and two sisters. He grew up with his mother and grandmother, Wilma Barron, mostly staying at his grandmother's home in the East Side of Buffalo while attending Turner-Carroll High School. After retiring from basketball, Page has worked as a radio host in sports talk shows.
