= 2003 Big East men's basketball tournament =

- Classification: Division I
- Season: 2002–03
- Teams: 12
- Site: Madison Square Garden; New York City
- Champions: Pittsburgh (1st title)
- Winning coach: Ben Howland (1st title)
- MVP: Julius Page (Pittsburgh)
- Top scorers: Carmelo Anthony (Syracuse); Ben Gordon (Connecticut) (50 points)

2002–03 Big East men's basketball standings
	Conf.				Overall
Team	W		L	PCT	W		L	PCT
East
Boston College	10	–	6	.625	19	–	12	.613
No. 23 Connecticut	10	–	6	.625	23	–	10	.697
Providence	8	–	8	.500	18	–	14	.563
Villanova	8	–	8	.500	15	–	16	.484
St. John's#	7	–	9	.438	1	–	13	.071
Miami	4	–	12	.250	11	–	17	.393
Virginia Tech*	4	–	12	.250	11	–	18	.379
West
No. 13 Syracuse	13	–	3	.813	30	–	5	.857
No. 4 Pittsburgh†	13	–	3	.813	28	–	5	.848
Seton Hall	10	–	6	.625	17	–	13	.567
No. 22 Notre Dame	10	–	6	.625	24	–	10	.706
Georgetown	6	–	10	.375	19	–	15	.559
West Virginia	5	–	11	.313	14	–	15	.483
Rutgers*	4	–	12	.250	12	–	16	.429
† 2003 Big East tournament winner As of March 31, 2003; Rankings from AP Poll #St. John's had 20 regular-season games vacated due to sanctions against the program; the school′s disputed record was 7–9, 21–13. *Did not qualify for 2003 Big East tournament.

The 2003 Big East men's basketball tournament, a part of the 2002–03 NCAA Division I men's basketball season, took place from March 12–15, 2003, at Madison Square Garden in New York City. Its winner will receive the Big East Conference's automatic bid to the 2003 NCAA tournament. It was a single-elimination tournament with four rounds and the four highest seeds (two from each Big East division) receive byes in the first round. The 6 Big East teams with the best conference records from both the East and West Divisions of the Big East Conference were invited to participate. Boston College, who had an identical 10–6 record as Connecticut, received the #1 seed from the East Division due to a tie breaker. Likewise, Syracuse, who had an identical 13–3 conference record to Pitt, received the #1 seed from West Division due to tiebreakers. Virginia Tech from the East Division and Rutgers from the West Division failed to make the tournament.
Pittsburgh defeated Connecticut, 74–56, in the finals to earn its first Big East tournament championship.

== Bracket ==
First round March 12, 2003
W5	Georgetown	46
E4	Villanova	41
E6	Miami	52
W3	Seton Hall	67
E5	St. John's	83
W4	#17 Notre Dame	80
W6	West Virginia	50
E3	Providence	73

Quarterfinals; March 13, 2003
W1	#11 Syracuse	74
W5	Georgetown	69
E2	Connecticut	83
W3	Seton Hall	70
E1	Boston College	82*
E5	St. John's	75
W2	#5 Pittsburgh	67
E3	Providence	57

Semifinals; March 14, 2003
W1	#11 Syracuse	67
E2	Connecticut	80
E1	Boston College	48
W2	#5 Pittsburgh	61

Championship Game; March 15, 2003
E2	Connecticut	56
W2	#5 Pittsburgh	74

* denotes an overtime (OT) period

Note: By finishing in last place during the regular season in their respective divisions, Virginia Tech and Rutgers did not qualify for the tournament.

== Championship game ==
On March 15, Pittsburgh won their first-ever Big East tournament, defeating Connecticut 74–56. They led by one at half-time, but quickly extended their lead in the second half. Jaron Brown led the Panthers with a career-high 19 points. Brown converted all six of his free throw attempts and was 6-of-9 from the field. He added ten rebounds to notch his fourth career double-double. Julius Page and Brandin Knight finished with 16 points apiece, and Chevon Troutman had 12. Page, a junior, averaged 13.3 points and 3.7 rebounds on 47.1 percent shooting (16-for-37) in the three tournament games. He won the Tournament MVP award. Knight averaged 12.0 points, 5.3 assists, 3.3 steals, and 3.3 rebounds in the tournament.

It was the third straight title game reached for Pittsburgh. Howland and the Panthers lost to Uconn in double overtime in 2002. It tied the largest margin of victory for a Panther team in the Big East tournament. They also defeated Boston College by eighteen, winning 88–70 on March 8, 2000. The win was Pittsburgh's ninth in a row, tying their season high. They also won nine in a row to begin the season.

== Awards ==
Dave Gavitt Trophy (Most Outstanding Player): Julius Page, Pittsburgh

All-Tournament Team

- Brandin Knight, Pittsburgh
- Ben Gordon, Connecticut
- Emeka Okafor, Connecticut
- Craig Smith, Boston College
- Carmelo Anthony, Syracuse
