= Carl Krauser =

American basketball player

Personal information
- Born: May 13, 1981 (age 45) New York City, New York, U.S.
- Listed height: 6 ft 1 in (1.85 m)
- Listed weight: 200 lb (91 kg)

Career information
- High school: Adlai E. Stevenson (Bronx, New York); St. Thomas More (Oakdale, Connecticut); Notre Dame Prep (Fitchburg, Massachusetts)
- College: Pittsburgh (2001–2006)
- NBA draft: 2006: undrafted
- Playing career: 2006–2012
- Position: Point guard

Career history
- 2006–2007: EWE Baskets Oldenburg
- 2007–2008: Pittsburgh Xplosion
- 2008: Gigantes de Guayana
- 2008: Indios de Mayagüez
- 2009: CSU Ploiești
- 2009–2010: Gaiteros del Zulia
- 2010: Waikato Pistons
- 2010–2011: Panteras de Miranda
- 2012: Laval Kebs

Career highlights
- 3× Second-team All-Big East (2004–2006); 2× AP Honorable Mention All-American (2004, 2006); Big East Most Improved Player (2004)

Carl Isaac Krauser (born May 13, 1981) is an American former professional basketball player who last played for the Quebec Kebs of the National Basketball League of Canada. He was a point guard for the University of Pittsburgh Panthers from 2001 to 2006. Krauser is 6 feet 1 inch (1.85 m) and weighs 200 pounds (91 kg).

== High school career ==
Krauser was born on May 13, 1981, to Joyeria Mays and musician Mario Krauser in the Bronxdale housing projects in The Bronx, New York, where he lived with over 3,500 other people. By the time he was 13, basketball was a large part of his life. Krauser talked about his competitive drive in a Pittsburgh Post-Gazette article about his peers at the time, "When they lost, they went and got an Icee or a juice. When I lost, I wanted to go play again." He was also known for taken 1000 jump shots every night for practice. He went to dangerous neighborhoods to play at his Boys and Girls club and Rosedale "The Big Park" in the Bronx, and played streetball at Rucker Park. One nickname he had while living in New York City was "Black Magic".

Krauser also played with other players who found success in their basketball careers including Seton Hall's Andre Barrett and former Duke star and NBA player Jay (Jason) Williams. Krauser's career took another step when he made the New York AAU team, the Broncos. When Krauser was 17, he had to repeat his junior year of high school, but instead of repeating the year at Stevenson High School, where he did not make the freshmen basketball team, he chose to attend St. Thomas More Prep. Krauser left St. Thomas More Prep in Connecticut and switched to Notre Dame Academy in Fitchburg, Massachusetts. After performing better academically, Krauser was heavily recruited by Hofstra and the University of Pittsburgh. Jamie Dixon, then the assistant coach at Pitt, was able to recruit Krauser successfully. In his final game at Notre Dame Prep, Krauser scored 51 points.

Outside of basketball, Krauser was 2–0 as an amateur boxer.

== College career ==
=== 2001-2003 ===
Carl was known for his trademark symbol he made where after scoring a basket, put his hands over his head in the shape of an "X" and claimed it was to represent the Bronx.

Krauser's first season at Pitt was the 2001-2002 basketball season. Carl was redshirted for his actual freshman season by former Pitt coach, future UCLA head coach, Ben Howland. After spending his first season at Pitt as a redshirt, Krauser came into a stronger Pitt basketball program with guards such as Julius Page and Brandin Knight. In Krauser's first playing season, he averaged 6 points, 2.8 rebounds, and 2.9 assists per game. Krauser had 93 assists in this season, which was the fourth most all time at Pitt by a freshman at that time. Krauser was also named the Most Improved Player at the team's banquet that year. The Panthers made it into the NCAA Tournament in 2002, advancing to the Sweet Sixteen where they lost to Kent State.

=== 2003-2004 ===
Krauser's sophomore season showed marked improvement from his freshman year. He received an All-American Honorable Mention by the Associated Press, the Big East's Most Improved Player, and All-Big East second team honors. Pitt chose him as the team's Most Inspiration Player and the best Free Throw Shooter. Krauser led the team averaging 15.4 points, 4.9 rebounds, and 4.5 assists per game in 2003–04. Carl helped to lead the Pitt Panthers to a berth in the NCAA tournament, where the Panthers again made the Sweet Sixteen before falling to the Oklahoma State Cowboys.

=== 2004-2005 ===
In his junior year, Krauser was the leader of team. Pitt had lost both Jaron Brown and Julius Page to graduation, and Krauser was now the floor general for younger players such as freshman guard Ronald Ramon. Some highlights from that season include 31 points against the University of Richmond Spiders, 5 steals against Robert Morris University, and 15 assists against West Virginia. Krauser received the John Wooden Award in his junior season and was also named as a Naismith All-American and a Bob Cousy Award finalist. He was honored by the Big East with two player of the week awards and by being named to the Second-Team All Big East.

Krauser led the Panthers to another NCAA Tournament berth as a 9th seed where they lost to 8th seed University of the Pacific. In the offseason, Krauser entered the 2005 NBA draft but removed his name without hiring an agent so he could retain his NCAA eligibility and play his fifth and final college season at Pitt. Krauser was included in a Sports Illustrated article where he was ranked as one of the top 10 point guards in the nation, and at midseason was predicted to be selected in the NBA draft.

=== 2005-2006 ===
Pitt finished its non-conference season at 11–0 after beating the then No. 22 Wisconsin Badgers by 9 points. Pitt was one of the final seven teams as of January 3 to be undefeated. Krauser went on to lead Pitt to a 21–6 regular season, and Pitt finished 6th in the Big East. The Panthers would go on to lose the Big East Championship game against Syracuse. The Orange made the finals after winning three games in three days. On January 23, 2006 Krauser scored a career-high 32 points against Syracuse. Krauser finished the regular season with 15.0 points per game, 4.7 assists per game, and 4.3 rebounds per game. As a 5 seed, Pitt lost in an upset to #13 seed Bradley in the second round of the 2006 NCAA Tournament—Krauser's last game at Pitt. Though he struggled down the stretch with his shooting touch, he remained the emotional leader on a quickly maturing team. Krauser wore number 11 while at Pitt in honor of Isiah Thomas.

== Professional career ==
Krauser spent the 2007–08 season as a member of the Pittsburgh Xplosion, of the Continental Basketball Association. He was joined by former Pitt player John DeGroat.

Halfway through the 2008–09 season, Krauser joined the Romanian basketball club CSU Asesoft Ploieşti and appeared in 23 games for the team between January 17 and May 23 of the year 2009. He averaged 16.3 minutes and 5.5 points per game.

In 2010, Krauser signed with the Waikato Pistons of the New Zealand National Basketball League. He appeared in 5 games for the Pistons in the 2010 season averaging 22.6 minutes and 10 points per game.

On January 23, 2012, it was announced that the Quebec Kebs of the National Basketball League of Canada had signed Krauser to their active roster.

On August 22, 2014, it was announced that Krauser would be joining the Steel City Yellow Jackets of the ABA.
