= Barry Rohrssen =

American basketball player-coach

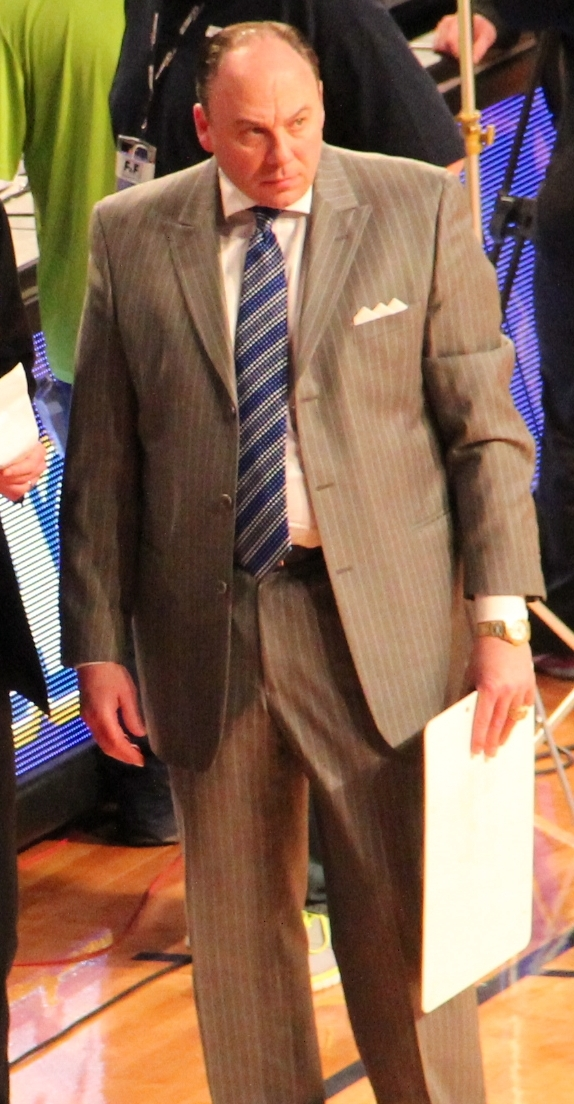
- Barry Rohrssen in 2014

Biographical details
- Born: June 24, 1960 (age 66); Brooklyn, New York

Playing career
- 1981–1983: St. Francis (NY)

Coaching career (HC unless noted)
- 1993–1995: St. Francis (NY) (assistant)
- 2001–2004: Pittsburgh (assistant)
- 2004–2006: Pittsburgh (asso. HC)
- 2006–2011: Manhattan
- 2012–2013: Idaho Stampede (assistant)
- 2013–2014: Pittsburgh (assistant)
- 2014–2015: Kentucky (assistant)
- 2015–2016: St. John's (assoc. HC)

Administrative career (AD unless noted)
- 1995–1997: UNLV (admin. asst.)
- 1997–1999: UNLV (dir. of ops.)
- 1999–2001: Pittsburgh (dir. of ops.)

Head coaching record
- Overall: 58–95

Barry "Slice" Rohrssen (born June 24, 1960) is an American college basketball coach and the former head men's basketball coach at Manhattan College. A native of Brooklyn, New York, he was named the 22nd head coach in Manhattan Jaspers basketball history on April 25, 2006. Rohrssen was fired on March 9, 2011, after going 58–95 over five seasons. He has also served as an assistant under John Calipari at Kentucky and at St. John's University under Chris Mullin.

Prior to being appointed at Manhattan, Rohrssen served as an assistant coach at St. Francis College (his alma mater), the University of Nevada, Las Vegas (UNLV), and the University of Pittsburgh. He was later promoted to associate head coach at Pittsburgh. He is well known for his ability as a recruiter (particularly in New York City) and was directly responsible for opening the pipeline from New York City to Pittsburgh. He did so by signing NYC natives like Levance Fields and Carl Krauser.

Rohrssen has also worked as an actor, with minor roles in several films, including Glengarry Glen Ross (1992). His most recent part was that of a referee in Uncle Drew (2018).

== Head coaching record ==
Record table
| Season | Team | Overall | Conference | Standing | Postseason |
|---|---|---|---|---|---|
Manhattan Jaspers (Metro Atlantic Athletic Conference) (2006–2010)
| 2006–07 | Manhattan | 13–17 | 10–8 | T–4th | |
| 2007–08 | Manhattan | 12–19 | 5–13 | 8th | |
| 2008–09 | Manhattan | 16–14 | 9–9 | T–4th | |
| 2009–10 | Manhattan | 11–20 | 4–14 | 10th | |
| 2010–11 | Manhattan | 6–25 | 3–15 | T–9th | |
| Manhattan: | | 58–95 | 31–59 | | |
| Total: | | 58–95 | | | |
