= Craig Esherick =

American basketball coach

Biographical details
- Born: November 1, 1956 (age 69); Silver Spring, Maryland, U.S.

Playing career
- 1974–1978: Georgetown

Coaching career (HC unless noted)
- 1979–1981: Georgetown (GA)
- 1982–1999: Georgetown (assistant)
- 1999–2004: Georgetown

Head coaching record
- Overall: 103–74
- Tournaments: 2–1 (NCAA Division I); 5–3 (NIT)

Craig Robert Esherick (born November 1, 1956) is an American academic, lawyer, and former basketball coach who is currently an assistant professor of sport management for George Mason University and color commentator for college basketball games. He was formerly the head coach of the Georgetown University men's basketball team and assistant basketball coach and scout for the 1988 U.S. Men's Olympic basketball team.

== Biography ==
Esherick grew up in Silver Spring, Maryland, and graduated from Springbrook High School in 1974 as an all-state forward. He was a four-year basketball letterman at Georgetown from 1974 to 1978 and thereafter attended Georgetown University Law School, receiving a J.D. degree in 1982. During his final two years of law school at Georgetown, he served as a graduate assistant to John Thompson In 1982, Thompson offered Esherick the position of assistant coach, and along with former teammate Mike Riley, he stayed in the position for the next 17½ seasons. After abruptly resigning in January 1999, Thompson named Esherick head coach.

=== Georgetown head coach ===
Esherick continued the style of play and scheduling habits of his predecessor as coach. During his 5½-season tenure, Esherick came under growing criticism for the weak non-conference teams he scheduled, and his inability to close out tight games.

After Esherick took over the team on January 8, 1999, Georgetown finished the 1998–99 season with a record of 15–15 before falling to Princeton Tigers in the first round of the 1999 National Invitation Tournament. The 1999–2000 team improved to 19–15, earning another NIT bid. Following a quadruple overtime win over the Virginia Cavaliers, 115–111, Georgetown lost to the California Golden Bears in the second round.

In Esherick's third season, 2000–01, the team made the 2001 NCAA Division I men's basketball tournament under the stardom of future top-10 National Basketball Association draft pick Mike Sweetney. The Hoyas made it to the "Sweet 16", losing to the Maryland Terrapins in the West Region Semifinals.

Esherick's final three seasons proved disappointing. The 2001–02 season saw the Hoyas narrowly miss the NCAA tournament with a 19–11 mark, and Esherick was criticized for rejecting a bid to the 2002 NIT, as he objected to playing away from home throughout that tournament because of the number of classes his players would miss. In the 2002–03 season, Georgetown earned a bid to the 2003 NIT, in which the Hoyas advanced to the championship game, losing to St. John's.

The departure of Mike Sweetney left the Hoyas' lineup bare entering the 2003–04 season, in which the Hoyas started 13–6 before collapsing and losing their last nine games of the season, ending with a 13–15 record.

A year earlier, Georgetown had extended Esherick's contract through 2009. He indicated to the press late in the 2003–04 season that his position as head coach was secure, that he had a good recruiting class joining the team for the following season – it included future stars Jeff Green, Roy Hibbert, and Jonathan Wallace – and that they should "stay tuned," and Georgetown president John DeGioia gave him a public show of support around the same time. Despite all this, and despite Esherick's declaration on March 5, 2004, that "I ain't going anywhere – I may be here for another 30 years," DeGioia fired him on March 16, 2004, six days after the end of the season, following student protests over his continued tenure and failure to produce winning teams. Esherick had spent 28 of the first 30 years of his adult life at Georgetown as a player, assistant coach, and head coach. He was replaced by John Thompson, Jr.'s son, Princeton University head coach John Thompson III.

== Head coaching record ==
Record table
Season	Team	Overall	Conference	Standing	Postseason
Georgetown Hoyas (Big East) (1999–2004)
1998–99	Georgetown	8–10^{‡}	6–8^{‡}	10th	NIT First Round
1999–2000	Georgetown	19–15	6–10	T–8th	NIT Second Round
2000–01	Georgetown	25–8	10–6	T–2nd (West)	NCAA Division I Sweet 16
2001–02	Georgetown	19–11	9–7	T–3rd (West)	Declined NIT invitation
2002–03	Georgetown	19–15	6–10	5th (West)	NIT Runner-up
2003–04	Georgetown	13–15	4–12	T–12th	
Georgetown:		103–74 (.582)	41–53 (.436)		
Total:		103–74 (.582)			

‡ John Thompson Jr. resigned on January 8, 1999, with Georgetown's record at 7–6 overall and 0–4 in the Big East; Esherick coached the rest of season. Georgetown's record for the entire 1998–99 season was 15–16 overall and 6–12 in the Big East.
