= 2002–03 Connecticut Huskies men's basketball team =

American college basketball season

2002–03 Connecticut Huskies men's basketball

Big East East Division regular season co-champions

NCAA tournament, Sweet Sixteen
- Conference: Big East Conference

Ranking
- Coaches: No. 11
- AP: No. 23
- Record: 23–10 (10–6 Big East)
- Head coach: Jim Calhoun (17th season)
- Assistant coaches: George Blaney; Tom Moore; Clyde Vaughan
- Home arena: Hartford Civic Center; Harry A. Gampel Pavilion

2002–03 Big East men's basketball standings
| | Conf. | | | | Overall |
| Team | W | | L | PCT | W | | L | PCT |
|---|---|---|---|---|---|---|---|---|
East
| Boston College | 10 | – | 6 | .625 | 19 | – | 12 | .613 |
| No. 23 Connecticut | 10 | – | 6 | .625 | 23 | – | 10 | .697 |
| Providence | 8 | – | 8 | .500 | 18 | – | 14 | .563 |
| Villanova | 8 | – | 8 | .500 | 15 | – | 16 | .484 |
| St. John's# | 7 | – | 9 | .438 | 1 | – | 13 | .071 |
| Miami | 4 | – | 12 | .250 | 11 | – | 17 | .393 |
| Virginia Tech* | 4 | – | 12 | .250 | 11 | – | 18 | .379 |
West
| No. 13 Syracuse | 13 | – | 3 | .813 | 30 | – | 5 | .857 |
| No. 4 Pittsburgh† | 13 | – | 3 | .813 | 28 | – | 5 | .848 |
| Seton Hall | 10 | – | 6 | .625 | 17 | – | 13 | .567 |
| No. 22 Notre Dame | 10 | – | 6 | .625 | 24 | – | 10 | .706 |
| Georgetown | 6 | – | 10 | .375 | 19 | – | 15 | .559 |
| West Virginia | 5 | – | 11 | .313 | 14 | – | 15 | .483 |
| Rutgers* | 4 | – | 12 | .250 | 12 | – | 16 | .429 |
† 2003 Big East tournament winner As of March 31, 2003; Rankings from AP Poll #St. John's had 20 regular-season games vacated due to sanctions against the program; the school′s disputed record was 7–9, 21–13. *Did not qualify for 2003 Big East tournament.

The 2002–03 Connecticut Huskies men's basketball team represented the University of Connecticut in the 2002–03 collegiate men's basketball season. The Huskies completed the season with a 23–10 overall record. The Huskies were members of the Big East Conference where they finished with a 10–6 record and were the regular season co-champions. UConn made it to the Sweet Sixteen in the 2003 NCAA Division I men's basketball tournament before losing to Texas 82–78.

The Huskies played their home games at Harry A. Gampel Pavilion in Storrs, Connecticut and the Hartford Civic Center in Hartford, Connecticut, and they were led by seventeenth-year head coach Jim Calhoun.

== Roster ==
Listed are the student athletes who were members of the 2002–2003 team.

| Name | Position | Year |
|---|---|---|
| Rashad Anderson | G | FR |
| Hilton Armstrong | C | FR |
| Denham Brown | F | FR |
| Justin Brown | C | SR |
| Taliek Brown | G | JR |
| Justin Evanovich | G | JR |
| Ben Gordon | G | SO |
| Mike Hayes | F | SR |
| Scott Hazelton | F | SO |
| Emeka Okafor | C | SO |
| Tony Robertson | G | SR |
| Ryan Swaller | F | JR |
| Shamon Tooles | G | JR |
| Marcus White | F | FR |
| Chad Wise | G | SO |
| Mike Woodward | G | SR |

== Schedule ==
| Date time, TV | Rank^{#} | Opponent^{#} | Result | Record | Site (attendance) city, state |
Exhibition
| 11/4/2002* | | Louisiana Futures | W 132–74 | | Harry A. Gampel Pavilion; Storrs, CT |
| 11/16/2002* | | Harlem Globetrotters | W 80–65 | | Hartford Civic Center; Hartford, CT |
Regular Season
| 11/23/2002*; WTXX | No. 14 | Quinnipiac | W 91–72 | 1–0 | Harry A. Gampel Pavilion (10,167); Storrs, CT |
| 11/25/2002* | No. 12 | George Washington | W 67–55 | 2–0 | Hartford Civic Center (14,863); Hartford, CT |
| 12/1/2002*; WTXX | No. 11 | at Vanderbilt | W 76–70 | 3–0 | Memorial Gymnasium (12,490); Nashville, TN |
| 12/3/2002* | No. 11 | Sacred Heart | W 116–78 | 4–0 | Harry A. Gampel Pavilion (10,167); Storrs, CT |
| 12/7/2002*; WTXX | No. 11 | Wagner | W 97–85 | 5–0 | Harry A. Gampel Pavilion (10,167); Storrs, CT |
| 12/10/2002*; WTXX | No. 9 | Massachusetts | W 59–48 | 6–0 | Hartford Civic Center (14,962); Hartford, CT |
| 12/21/2002*; WTXX | No. 8 | UNC Asheville | W 117–67 | 7–0 | Hartford Civic Center (14,102); Hartford, CT |
| 12/28/2002*; WTXX | No. 6 | Central Connecticut | W 93–65 | 8–0 | Hartford Civic Center (16,294); Hartford, CT |
| 1/2/2003* | No. 5 | St. Bonaventure | W 95–78 | 9–0 | Hartford Civic Center (15,889); Hartford, CT |
| 1/7/2003*; ESPN2 | No. 3 | at No. 9 Oklahoma | L 63–73 | 9–1 | Lloyd Noble Center (11,638); Norman, OK |
| 1/11/2003; WTXX | No. 3 | Miami | W 83–80 ^{OT} | 10–1 (1–0) | Harry A. Gampel Pavilion (10,167); Storrs, CT |
| 1/14/2003; WTXX | No. 6 | Virginia Tech | W 83–65 | 11–1 (2–0) | Hartford Civic Center (16,294); Hartford, CT |
| 1/18/2003*; ESPN | No. 6 | at North Carolina | L 65–68 | 11–2 | Dean Smith Center (21,750); Chapel Hill, NC |
| 1/20/2003; ESPN | No. 11 | at Miami | L 76–77 | 11–3 (2–1) | BankUnited Center (6,884); Coral Gables, FL |
| 1/25/2003; WTXX | No. 11 | Villanova | W 74–65 | 12–3 (3–1) | Hartford Civic Center (16,294); Hartford, CT |
| 1/27/2003; ESPN | No. 14 | at St. John's | W 74–68 | 13–3 (4–1) | Madison Square Garden (21,750); New York, NY |
| 2/1/2003; WTXX | No. 18 | Boston College | L 71–95 | 13–4 (4–2) | Harry A. Gampel Pavilion (6,884); Storrs, CT |
| 2/5/2003; WTXX | No. 18 | at Virginia Tech | L 74–95 | 13–5 (4–3) | Cassell Coliseum (4,557); Blacksburg, VA |
| 2/8/2003; ESPN | No. 23 | at Providence | W 84–68 | 14–5 (5–3) | Dunkin' Donuts Center (12,993); Providence, RI |
| 2/10/2003; ESPN | No. 23 | No. 17 Syracuse; Rivalry | W 75–61 | 15–5 (6–3) | Hartford Civic Center (16,294); Hartford, CT |
| 2/15/2003; WTXX | | at Villanova | L 70–79 | 15–6 (6–4) | First Union Center (16,241); Philadelphia, PA |
| 2/19/2003; WTXX | | Rutgers | W 87–70 | 16–6 (7–4) | Hartford Civic Center (15,499); Hartford, CT |
| 2/22/2003; CBS | | St. John's | W 77–69 | 17–6 (8–4) | Harry A. Gampel Pavilion (10,167); Storrs, CT |
| 2/24/2003; ESPN | | at No. 9 Notre Dame | W 87–79 | 18–6 (9–4) | Edmund P. Joyce Center (11,418); Notre Dame, IN |
| 3/2/2003; CBS | | at No. 8 Pittsburgh | L 67–71 | 18–7 (9–5) | Petersen Events Center (12,508); Pittsburgh, PA |
| 3/5/2003; WTXX | | Providence | L 70–76 | 18–8 (9–6) | Harry A. Gampel Pavilion (10,167); Storrs, CT |
| 3/8/2003; ESPN | | at Boston College | W 91–54 | 19–8 (10–6) | Conte Forum (8,606); Boston, MA |
Big East tournament
| 3/13/2003; ESPN2 | | vs. Seton Hall; Quarterfinals | W 83–70 | 20–8 | Madison Square Garden (19,528); New York, NY |
| 3/14/2003; ESPN | | vs. No. 11 Syracuse; Semifinals/Rivalry | W 80–67 | 21–8 | Madison Square Garden (19,528); New York, NY |
| 3/15/2003; ESPN | | vs. No. 5 Pittsburgh; Championship | L 56–74 | 21–9 | Madison Square Garden (19,528); New York, NY |
NCAA tournament
| 3/20/2003*; CBS | (5 S) No. 23 | vs. (12 S) BYU; First Round | W 58–53 | 22–9 | Spokane Veterans Memorial Arena (11,284); Spokane, WA |
| 3/22/2003*; CBS | (5 S) No. 23 | vs. (4 S) No. 18 Stanford; Second Round | W 85–74 | 23–9 | Spokane Veterans Memorial Arena (11,271); Spokane, WA |
| 3/28/2003*; CBS | (5 S) No. 23 | vs. (1 S) No. 5 Texas; Sweet Sixteen | L 78–82 | 23–10 | Alamodome (30,009); San Antonio, TX |
*Non-conference game. ^{#}Rankings from AP Poll. (#) Tournament seedings in parentheses. All times are in Eastern Time.

Schedule Source:
