= 2002–03 St. John's Red Storm men's basketball team =

American college basketball season

2002–03 St. John's Red Storm men's basketball

NIT Champions (vacated)
- Conference: Big East Conference (1979–2013)
- Record: 1–13 (20 wins vacated) (7–9 Big East)
- Head coach: Mike Jarvis (5th year)
- Assistant coaches: Kevin Clark; Mike Jarvis II; Dermon Player
- Home arena: Alumni Hall; Madison Square Garden

2002–03 Big East men's basketball standings
	Conf.				Overall
Team	W		L	PCT	W		L	PCT
East
Boston College	10	–	6	.625	19	–	12	.613
No. 23 Connecticut	10	–	6	.625	23	–	10	.697
Providence	8	–	8	.500	18	–	14	.563
Villanova	8	–	8	.500	15	–	16	.484
St. John's#	7	–	9	.438	1	–	13	.071
Miami	4	–	12	.250	11	–	17	.393
Virginia Tech*	4	–	12	.250	11	–	18	.379
West
No. 13 Syracuse	13	–	3	.813	30	–	5	.857
No. 4 Pittsburgh†	13	–	3	.813	28	–	5	.848
Seton Hall	10	–	6	.625	17	–	13	.567
No. 22 Notre Dame	10	–	6	.625	24	–	10	.706
Georgetown	6	–	10	.375	19	–	15	.559
West Virginia	5	–	11	.313	14	–	15	.483
Rutgers*	4	–	12	.250	12	–	16	.429
† 2003 Big East tournament winner As of March 31, 2003; Rankings from AP Poll #St. John's had 20 regular-season games vacated due to sanctions against the program; the school′s disputed record was 7–9, 21–13. *Did not qualify for 2003 Big East tournament.

The 2002–03 St. John's Red Storm men's basketball team represented St. John's University during the 2002–03 NCAA Division I men's basketball season. The team was coached by Mike Jarvis in his fifth year. St. John's home games are played at Carnesecca Arena, then called Alumni Hall, and Madison Square Garden and the team is a member of the Big East Conference.

== Off season ==
=== Departures ===
Name	Number	Pos.	Height	Year	Hometown	Notes
Sharif Fordham	3	SG	6'4"	Senior	Far Rockaway, New York	Graduated
Alpha Bangura	15	SG	6'6"	Junior	Lanham, Maryland	Entered 2002 NBA draft/undrafted
Donald Emanuel	33	PG	6'9"	Senior	Houston, Texas	Graduated

=== Class of 2002 signees ===
College recruiting information
Name	Hometown	School	Height	Weight	Commit date
Elijah Ingram; PG	Jersey City, NJ	St. Anthony High School	6 ft 0 in (1.83 m)	170 lb (77 kg)	
Elijah Ingram; PG	Recruit ratings: Scout: Rivals:				
Daryll Hill; PG	Queens, NY	Milford Academy	6 ft 3 in (1.91 m)	170 lb (77 kg)	
Daryll Hill; PG	Recruit ratings: Scout: Rivals:				
Tim Doyle; SF	Merrick, NY	St. Dominic High School	6 ft 6 in (1.98 m)	215 lb (98 kg)	
Tim Doyle; SF	Recruit ratings: Scout: Rivals:				
Overall recruit ranking:
Note: In many cases, Scout, Rivals, 247Sports, On3, and ESPN may conflict in their listings of height and weight.; In these cases, the average was taken. ESPN grades are on a 100-point scale.; Sources: "2002 Team Ranking". Rivals.

=== Transfer additions ===
Name	Pos.	Height	Weight	Year	Hometown	Notes
Grady Reynolds	F	6'7"	210	Junior	Abbeyville, Alabama	junior college transfer from Southern Union State Community College (2 yrs immediate eligibility)

== Roster ==
2002–03 St. John's Red Storm men's basketball team
Players
Coaches

Pos.	#	Name	Height	Weight	Year	Previous school	Hometown
G/F	0	Tim Doyle	6 ft 6 in (1.98 m)	215 lb (98 kg)	Fr	St. Dominic's	Merrick, NY
G	1	Marcus Hatten	6 ft 1 in (1.85 m)	165 lb (75 kg)	Sr	Mergenthaler/Tallahassee	Baltimore, MD
G	2	Tristan Smith	6 ft 1 in (1.85 m)	180 lb (82 kg)	So	Amityville Memorial	Amityville, NY
G	3	Daryll Hill (redshirt)	6 ft 3 in (1.91 m)	170 lb (77 kg)	Fr	Cardozo/Milford Academy	Bayside, NY
C	4	Abe Keita	6 ft 11 in (2.11 m)	235 lb (107 kg)	Sr	Winchendon	Tolland, CT
F	5	Eric King	6 ft 6 in (1.98 m)	220 lb (100 kg)	So	Lincoln/Milford Academy	Brooklyn, NY
G	11	Jon Scheiman (W)	6 ft 1 in (1.85 m)	185 lb (84 kg)	Sr	LaGuardia	Manhattan, NY
G	12	Elijah Ingram	6 ft 0 in (1.83 m)	170 lb (77 kg)	Fr	St. Anthony's	East Orange, NJ
G	14	Andre Stanley (W)	6 ft 4 in (1.93 m)	215 lb (98 kg)	Jr	Globe Institute/John Jay	Brooklyn, NY
F	22	Anthony Glover	6 ft 6 in (1.98 m)	225 lb (102 kg)	GS	Rice	Bronx, NY
G/F	23	Willie Shaw	6 ft 6 in (1.98 m)	190 lb (86 kg)	Jr	Kennedy	Mount Vernon, NY
F	25	Kyle Cuffe	6 ft 9 in (2.06 m)	236 lb (107 kg)	Jr	Rice	Bronx, NY
F	33	Grady Reynolds	6 ft 7 in (2.01 m)	215 lb (98 kg)	Jr	Abbeville/Southern Union	Abbeville, AL
C	44	Mohamed Diakite (redshirt)	6 ft 11 in (2.11 m)	210 lb (95 kg)	Jr	Montrose Christian	Rockville, MD
C	52	Curtis Johnson	7 ft 3 in (2.21 m)	320 lb (145 kg)	Jr	Ryan Academy	Norfolk, VA

Head coach

- Mike Jarvis (Northeastern)

Assistant coach(es)

- Kevin Clark
- Mike Jarvis II
- Dermon Player

Legend

- (C) Team captain
- (S) Suspended
- (I) Ineligible
- (W) Walk-on
- Injured
- Current redshirt

Roster
Last update: May 27, 2020

== Schedule and results ==
Date time, TV	Rank^{#}	Opponent^{#}	Result	Record	Site (attendance) city, state
Exhibition
11/08/02*; 7:30pm, Metro		Harlem Globetrotters	W 86-61		Madison Square Garden (13,506); New York, NY
11/15/02*; 7:30pm		Israeli Pro Team	W 77-64		Alumni Hall (5,524); Queens, NY
Regular Season
11/26/02*; 7:30pm		Stony Brook	W 68-57	1-0	Alumni Hall (5,603); Queens, NY
11/30/02*; 7:30pm		at Fairfield	W 81-68	2-0	Webster Bank Arena (5,277); Bridgeport, CT
12/07/02*; 4:00pm		Fordham	W 81-58	3-0	Madison Square Garden (11,463); New York, NY
12/11/02*; 7:30pm		St. Francis (N.Y.)	W 80-58	4-0	Alumni Hall (5,462); Queens, NY
12/14/02*; 2:00pm, MSG		Hofstra	W 84-59	5-0	Madison Square Garden (10,729); New York, NY
12/21/02*; 3:30pm		at Wake Forest	L 72-84	5-1	Lawrence Joel Coliseum (10,173); Winston-Salem, NC
12/27/02*; 8:30pm, MSG		vs. Manhattan; ECAC Holiday Festival Opening Round	L 65-72	5-2	Madison Square Garden (14,179); New York, NY
12/28/02*; 3:00pm, MSG		vs. No. 22 North Carolina; ECAC Holiday Festival Consolation	L 59-63	5-3	Madison Square Garden (12,214); New York, NY
01/02/03*; 7:30pm		Niagara	W 78-68	6-3	Alumni Hall (5,485); Queens, NY
01/04/03; 12:00pm, MSG		Seton Hall	W 74-66	7-3 (1-0)	Madison Square Garden (9,412); New York, NY
01/08/03; 7:30pm		at Providence	L 71-75	7-4 (1-1)	Dunkin Donuts Center (8,367); Providence, RI
01/11/03*; 3:00pm, FOX		at UCLA	W 80-65	8-4 (1-1)	Pauley Pavilion (8,503); Los Angeles, CA
01/15/03; 7:30pm, MSG		Villanova	L 73-82	8-5 (1-2)	Madison Square Garden (10,684); New York, NY
01/18/03; 12:00pm		at Georgetown	W 77-72	9-5 (2-2)	MCI Center (11,777); Washington, D.C.
01/25/03; 2:00pm		at Virginia Tech	W 62-59	10-5 (3-2)	Cassell Coliseum (5,628); Blacksburg, VA
01/27/03; 7:00pm, ESPN		No. 14 Connecticut	L 68-74	10-6 (3-3)	Madison Square Garden (N/A); New York, NY
02/02/03; 2:00pm, MSG		Miami (FL)	W 77-74	11-6 (4-3)	Madison Square Garden (10,341); New York, NY
02/05/03; 7:30pm, Metro		at Boston College	L 82-84	11-7 (4-4)	Silvio O. Conte Forum (6,733); Chestnut Hill, MA
02/08/03; 4:00pm, MSG		Virginia Tech	L 54-71	11-8 (4-5)	Alumni Hall (6,008); Queens, NY
02/11/03; 7:00pm, ESPN2		at Villanova	W 52-50	12-8 (5-5)	First Union Center (10,017); Philadelphia, PA
02/15/03; 2:00pm, MSG		Providence	L 59-69	12-9 (5-6)	Alumni Hall (6,008); Queens, NY
02/18/03; 7:00pm, ESPN2		at No. 15 Syracuse	L 60-66	12-10 (5-7)	Carrier Dome (21,044); Syracuse, NY
02/22/03; 2:00pm, CBS		at Connecticut	L 69-77	12-11 (5-8)	Gampel Pavilion (10,167); Storrs, CT
02/26/03; 7:30pm, MSG		Boston College	L 63-81	12-12 (5-9)	Madison Square Garden (10,069); New York, NY
03/02/03*; 12:00pm, CBS		No. 6 Duke	W 72-71	13-12 (5-9)	Madison Square Garden (19,610); New York, NY
03/06/03; 7:30pm, MSG		Rutgers	W 75-59	14-12 (6-9)	Madison Square Garden (8,648); New York, NY
03/08/03; 9:00pm, ESPN		at Miami (FL)	W 76-73	15-12 (7-9)	Convocation Center (3,828); Coral Gables, Florida
Big East tournament
03/12/03; 12:00pm, ESPN		vs. No. 17 Notre Dame; Big East tournament first round	W 83-80	16-12 (7-9)	Madison Square Garden (19,786); New York, NY
03/13/03; 12:00pm, ESPN		vs. Boston College; Big East tournament quarterfinals	L 75-82 ^{OT}	16-13 (7-9)	Madison Square Garden (N/A); New York, NY
NIT Tournament
03/19/03; 7:30pm		Boston University; NIT First Round	W 62-57	17-13 (7-9)	Alumni Hall (2,653); Queens, NY
03/24/03; 7:30pm		Virginia; NIT Second Round	W 73-63	18-13 (7-9)	Alumni Hall (3,435); Queens, NY
03/27/03; 7:30pm		UAB; NIT Quarterfinal	W 79-71	19-13 (7-9)	Alumni Hall (3,227); Queens, NY
04/01/03; 9:30pm, ESPN		vs. Texas Tech; NIT Semifinal	W 64-63	20-13 (7-9)	Madison Square Garden (10,008); New York, NY
04/03/03; 8:00pm, ESPN2		vs. Georgetown; NIT Championship	W 70-67	21-13 (7-9)	Madison Square Garden (12,406); New York, NY
*Non-conference game. ^{#}Rankings from AP Poll. (#) Tournament seedings in parentheses.
