= 2002–03 Miami Hurricanes men's basketball team =

American college basketball season

2002–03 Miami Hurricanes men's basketball
- Conference: Big East Conference
- Record: 11-17 (4-12 Big East)
- Head coach: Perry Clark
- Home arena: Convocation Center; Miami Arena

2002–03 Big East men's basketball standings
	Conf.				Overall
Team	W		L	PCT	W		L	PCT
East
Boston College	10	–	6	.625	19	–	12	.613
No. 23 Connecticut	10	–	6	.625	23	–	10	.697
Providence	8	–	8	.500	18	–	14	.563
Villanova	8	–	8	.500	15	–	16	.484
St. John's#	7	–	9	.438	1	–	13	.071
Miami	4	–	12	.250	11	–	17	.393
Virginia Tech*	4	–	12	.250	11	–	18	.379
West
No. 13 Syracuse	13	–	3	.813	30	–	5	.857
No. 4 Pittsburgh†	13	–	3	.813	28	–	5	.848
Seton Hall	10	–	6	.625	17	–	13	.567
No. 22 Notre Dame	10	–	6	.625	24	–	10	.706
Georgetown	6	–	10	.375	19	–	15	.559
West Virginia	5	–	11	.313	14	–	15	.483
Rutgers*	4	–	12	.250	12	–	16	.429
† 2003 Big East tournament winner As of March 31, 2003; Rankings from AP Poll #St. John's had 20 regular-season games vacated due to sanctions against the program; the school′s disputed record was 7–9, 21–13. *Did not qualify for 2003 Big East tournament.

The 2002–03 Miami Hurricanes men's basketball team represented the University of Miami during the 2002–03 NCAA Division I men's basketball season. The Hurricanes, led by head coach Perry Clark, played their home games at the Convocation Center and Miami Arena and were members of the Big East Conference.

On December 21, 2002, Florida defeated Miami (FL) in the Orange Bowl Basketball Classic 94–93 in 2OT.

Miami finished the season with a 11–17 record. Miami's season ended with a 67–52 loss to Seton Hall in the Big East tournament first round on March 12, 2003.
