= 2002–03 Syracuse Orangemen basketball team =

American college basketball season

2002–03 Syracuse Orangemen men's basketball

NCAA tournament National Champions Big East regular season co-champions

National Championship Game, W 81–78 vs. Kansas
- Conference: Big East Conference

Ranking
- Coaches: No. 1
- AP: No. 13
- Record: 30–5 (13–3 Big East)
- Head coach: Jim Boeheim (27th season)
- Assistant coaches: Bernie Fine (27th season); Mike Hopkins (8th season); Troy Weaver (3rd season)
- Home arena: Carrier Dome

2002–03 Big East men's basketball standings
	Conf.				Overall
Team	W		L	PCT	W		L	PCT
East
Boston College	10	–	6	.625	19	–	12	.613
No. 23 Connecticut	10	–	6	.625	23	–	10	.697
Providence	8	–	8	.500	18	–	14	.563
Villanova	8	–	8	.500	15	–	16	.484
St. John's#	7	–	9	.438	1	–	13	.071
Miami	4	–	12	.250	11	–	17	.393
Virginia Tech*	4	–	12	.250	11	–	18	.379
West
No. 13 Syracuse	13	–	3	.813	30	–	5	.857
No. 4 Pittsburgh†	13	–	3	.813	28	–	5	.848
Seton Hall	10	–	6	.625	17	–	13	.567
No. 22 Notre Dame	10	–	6	.625	24	–	10	.706
Georgetown	6	–	10	.375	19	–	15	.559
West Virginia	5	–	11	.313	14	–	15	.483
Rutgers*	4	–	12	.250	12	–	16	.429
† 2003 Big East tournament winner As of March 31, 2003; Rankings from AP Poll #St. John's had 20 regular-season games vacated due to sanctions against the program; the school′s disputed record was 7–9, 21–13. *Did not qualify for 2003 Big East tournament.

The 2002–03 Syracuse Orangemen basketball team represented Syracuse University in NCAA men's basketball competition in the 2002–03 Division I season. The head coach was Jim Boeheim, serving for his 27th year. The team played its home games at the Carrier Dome in Syracuse, New York. The team finished with a 30–5 (13–3) record, while capturing its first modern-era NCAA Championship.

The team had just one senior, guard Kueth Duany. He was joined in the starting lineup by forwards Hakim Warrick (sophomore), Carmelo Anthony (freshman), center Craig Forth (sophomore), and guard Gerry McNamara (freshman). Other key contributors included guards Josh Pace (sophomore) and Billy Edelin (freshman), and center Jeremy McNeil (junior).

== Season recap ==
Things did not start well for Syracuse. Guards DeShaun Williams and James Thues both left the team. Williams transferred to Iona while Thues left for Detroit. Freshman point guard Billy Edelin was suspended for 12 games for participating in a non-sanctioned basketball league. Syracuse then started its season with a loss against Memphis, despite Carmelo Anthony's 27 points, a then-high for a Syracuse freshman debut.

But things turned around, as Syracuse went 13–3 in the Big East, with several memorable wins. McNamara would establish himself as a clutch player, nailing a game-winning 3-pointer as then-No. 17 Syracuse notched an 82–80 win over then-No. 10 Notre Dame in February. In an upset of then-No. 24 Syracuse over then-No. 2 Pittsburgh, McNeil, a career 49.1% free throw shooter, hit two key free throws, and added a game-winning tip in a 67–65 upset.

The Orangemen would play five Big 12 teams throughout the year, including games against Missouri in the regular season, and against Oklahoma (Elite Eight), Oklahoma State (second round), Texas (National Semifinal) and then Kansas (National Championship game).

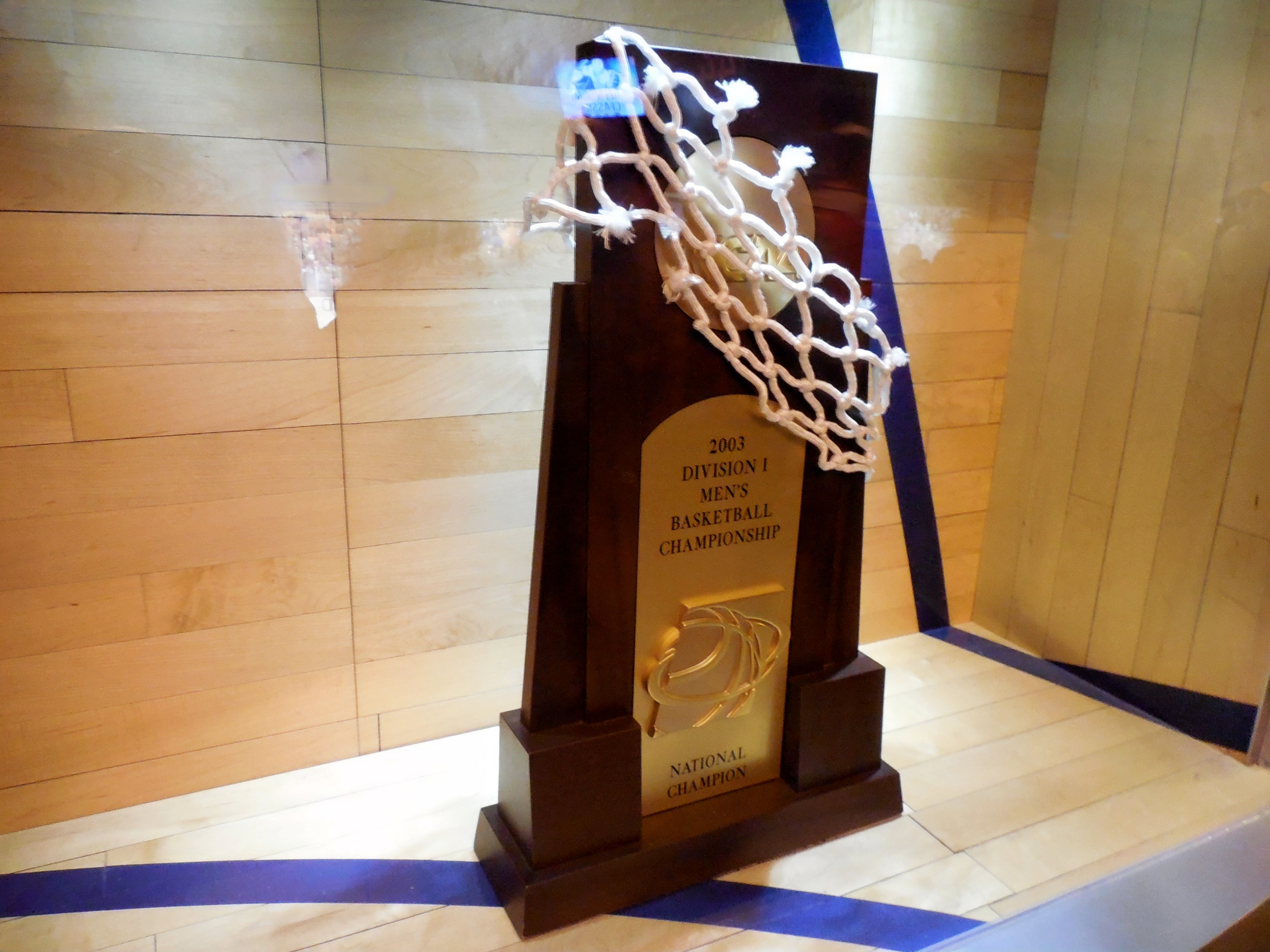
2003 NCAA Men's Basketball National Championship Trophy.

In the championship game against Kansas, with Syracuse leading by three with under 15 seconds left, Warrick missed two free throws that would've sealed the game with Syracuse hanging on to a three-point lead, 81–78. With 1.5 seconds left and the score still the same, Kansas' Michael Lee was open on the baseline for a potential game-tying 3-pointer. But Warrick used his long arms to block Lee's attempt and Syracuse captured its first-ever national championship.

Coincidentally, the game was played in the Superdome in New Orleans, where Syracuse had lost the National Championship to Indiana in 1987 on a last-second shot by Keith Smart.

== Schedule ==
Date time, TV	Rank^{#}	Opponent^{#}	Result	Record	High points	High rebounds	High assists	Site (attendance) city, state
Non-conference regular season
November 14, 2002*; 7:00 pm, ESPN2		vs. Memphis; Coaches vs. Cancer Classic	L 63–70	0–1	27 – Anthony	11 – Tied	3 – McNamara	Madison Square Garden (8,826); New York, New York
November 24, 2002*		Valparaiso	W 81–66	1–1	28 – Anthony	10 – Tied	6 – Pace	Carrier Dome (18,874); Syracuse, New York
December 03, 2002*		Colgate	W 98–68	2–1	27 – Anthony	11 – Anthony	7 – Pace	Carrier Dome (15,615); Syracuse, New York
December 06, 2002*		Cornell	W 85–62	3–1	21 – Anthony	10 – Tied	5 – Tied	Carrier Dome (16,384); Syracuse, New York
December 10, 2003*		UNC Greensboro	W 92–65	4–1	23 – Warrick	8 – Forth	4 – Anthony	Carrier Dome (16,941); Syracuse, New York
December 14, 2002*		Binghamton	W 94–58	5–1	24 – Anthony	11 – Anthony	5 – Anthony	Carrier Dome (19,770); Syracuse, New York
December 21, 2002*; 12:00 pm, ESPN		Georgia Tech	W 92–65	6–1	25 – McNamara	11 – Tied	10 – McNamara	Carrier Dome (18,804); Syracuse, New York
December 28, 2002*		Albany	W 109–79	7–1	28 – Anthony	9 – Tied	9 – McNamara	Carrier Dome (18,683); Syracuse, New York
December 30, 2002*		Canisius	W 87–69	8–1	25 – Warrick	14 – Anthony	3 – Tied	Carrier Dome (17,305); Syracuse, New York
Big East Regular Season
January 08, 2003; 7:30 pm, ESPN Plus		at Seton Hall	W 70–66	9–1 (1–0)	20 – Duany	7 – Warrick	5 – McNamara	Continental Airlines Arena (8,415); East Rutherford, New Jersey
January 11, 2003		Boston College	W 82–74	10–1 (2–0)	24 – Tied	15 – Warrick	5 – Tied	Carrier Dome (20,692); Syracuse, New York
January 13, 2003*; 7:00 pm, ESPN		No. 11 Missouri	W 76–69	11–1	20 – Warrick	10 – Anthony	7 – McNamara	Carrier Dome (18,756); Syracuse, New York
January 18, 2003; 12:00 pm, ESPN		at No. 3 Pittsburgh	L 60–73	11–2 (2–1)	19 – McNamara	10 – Warrick	3 – McNamara	Petersen Events Center (12,508); Pittsburgh, Pennsylvania
January 22, 2003; 7:00 pm, ESPN Plus		Seton Hall	W 83–65	12–2 (3–1)	22 – Warrick	10 – Warrick	6 – Tied	Carrier Dome (17,119); Syracuse, New York
January 26, 2003; 1:00 pm, CBS		at Miami (FL)	W 54–49	13–2 (4–1)	18 – Warrick	14 – Anthony	4 – Tied	Miami Convocation Center (5,789); Coral Gables, Florida
January 29, 2003; 7:30 pm, ESPN Plus		at Rutgers	L 65–68	13–3 (4–2)	17 – Anthony	11 – Warrick	4 – Edelin	Louis Brown Athletic Center (8,007); Piscataway, New Jersey
February 01, 2003; 7:00 pm, ESPN Plus		No. 2 Pittsburgh	W 67–65	14–3 (5–2)	20 – Warrick	13 – Anthony	4 – McNamara	Carrier Dome (30,303); Syracuse, New York
February 03, 2003; 7:00 pm, ESPN	No. 21	Georgetown; Rivalry	W 88–80	15–3 (6–2)	22 – Tied	7 – Tied	3 – Tied	Carrier Dome (20,702); Syracuse, New York
February 08, 2003; 4:00 pm, ESPN Plus	No. 21	at West Virginia	W 94–80	16–3 (7–2)	29 – Anthony	12 – Anthony	12 – McNamara	WVU Coliseum (13,092); Morgantown, West Virginia
February 10, 2003; 7:00 pm, ESPN	No. 18	at No. 19 Connecticut	L 61–75	16–4 (7–3)	29 – Anthony	11 – Anthony	4 – McNamara	Hartford Civic Center (16,294); Hartford, Connecticut
February 15, 2003; 1:00 pm, ESPN	No. 18	No. 9 Notre Dame	W 82–80	17–4 (8–3)	26 – Anthony	12 – Warrick	6 – McNamara	Carrier Dome (32,116); Syracuse, New York
February 18, 2003; 7:00 pm, ESPN2	No. 17	St. John's	W 66–60	18–4 (9–3)	21 – Anthony	13 – Anthony	5 – McNamara	Carrier Dome (21,044); Syracuse, New York
February 23, 2003*; 2:00 pm, CBS	No. 17	at Michigan State	W 76–75	19–4	25 – Anthony	8 – Warrick	4 – Anthony	Breslin Center (14,759); East Lansing, Michigan
February 26, 2003; 7:00 pm, ESPN Plus	No. 15	West Virginia	W 89–51	20–4 (10–3)	24 – Anthony	10 – Anthony	6 – McNamara	Carrier Dome (19,484); Syracuse, New York
March 01, 2003; 1:00 pm, ABC	No. 15	at Georgetown; Rivalry	W 93–84 ^{OT}	21–4 (11–3)	30 – Anthony	18 – Warrick	2 – Tied	MCI Center (17,352); Washington, D.C.
March 04, 2003; 7:00 pm, ESPN2	No. 12	at No. 16 Notre Dame	W 92–88	22–4 (12–3)	26 – Edelin	13 – Warrick	7 – Warrick	Joyce Center (11,450); South Bend, Indiana
March 09, 2003	No. 12	Rutgers	W 83–74	23–4 (13–3)	30 – Anthony	14 – Anthony	7 – McNamara	Carrier Dome (33,071); Syracuse, New York
Big East Tournament
March 13, 2003; 7:00 pm, ESPN	(1 W) No. 11	vs. (5 W) Georgetown; Quarterfinal/Rivalry	W 74–69	24–4	21 – Anthony	8 – Forth	3 – McNamara	Madison Square Garden (19,528); New York, New York
March 14, 2003; 9:00 pm, ESPN	(1 W) No. 11	vs. (2 E) Connecticut; Semifinal	L 67–80	24–5	29 – Anthony	15 – Anthony	3 – McNamara	Madison Square Garden (19,528); New York, New York
NCAA Tournament
March 21, 2003*; 12:15 pm, CBS	(3 E) No. 13	vs. (14 E) Manhattan; First Round	W 76–65	25–5	17 – Anthony	9 – Anthony	4 – Tied	FleetCenter (18,141); Boston, Massachusetts
March 23, 2003*; 2:40 pm, CBS	(3 E) No. 13	vs. (6 E) No. 23 Oklahoma State; Second Round	W 68–56	26–5	20 – Edelin	8 – Tied	6 – McNamara	FleetCenter (18,389); Boston, Massachusetts
March 28, 2003*; 9:40 pm, CBS	(3 E) No. 13	vs. (10 E) Auburn; Sweet Sixteen	W 79–78	27–5	18 – Anthony	8 – Anthony	4 – Edelin	Pepsi Arena (15,093); Albany, New York
March 30, 2003*; 2:40 pm, CBS	(3 E) No. 13	vs. (1 E) No. 3 Oklahoma; Elite Eight	W 63–47	28–5	20 – Anthony	10 – Anthony	4 – Warrick	Pepsi Arena (15,207); Albany, New York
April 05, 2003*; 8:40 pm, CBS	(3 E) No. 13	vs. (1 S) No. 5 Texas; Final Four	W 95–84	29–5	33 – Anthony	14 – Anthony	4 – Tied	Louisiana Superdome (54,432); New Orleans, Louisiana
April 07, 2003*; 9:20 pm, CBS	(3 E) No. 13	vs. (2 W) No. 6 Kansas; National Championship	W 81–78	30–5	20 – Anthony	10 – Anthony	7 – Anthony	Louisiana Superdome (54,524); New Orleans, Louisiana
*Non-conference game. ^{#}Rankings from AP Poll. (#) Tournament seedings in parentheses. All times are in Eastern Time. E = East, S = South, W = West.

== Roster ==
Name	Number	Position	Height	Weight	Year	Hometown	PPG	APG	RPG
Hakim Warrick	1	F	6–9	219	Sophomore	Philadelphia, PA	14.8	1.6	8.5
Gerry McNamara	3	G	6–2	182	Freshman	Scranton, PA	13.3	4.4	2.3
Josh Pace	5	G/F	6–5	190	Sophomore	Griffin, GA	4.3	1.9	2.7
Kueth Duany	13	G/F	6–6	190	Senior	Sudan/Bloomington, IN	11.0	2.0	3.7
Billy Edelin	14	G	6–4	195	Freshman	Silver Spring, MD	9.0	2.5	3.4
Carmelo Anthony	15	F	6–8	230	Freshman	Baltimore, MD	22.2	2.2	10.0
Matt Gorman	24	F/C	6–9	235	Freshman	Watertown, NY	2.3	0.1	2.1
Jeremy McNeil	34	C	6–8	257	Junior	San Antonio, TX	3.3	0.2	4.2
Craig Forth	51	C	7–1	255	Sophomore	Albany, NY	3.8	0.9	3.3
Andrew Kouwe	10	PG	6–0	170	Junior	Tampa, FL	1.7	0.3	0.3
Ronneil Herron	11	G	5–11	158	Senior	Warner Robins, GA	1.2	0.0	1.0
Tyrone Albright	2	G	5–11	165	Junior	Syracuse, NY	0.0	0.1	0.3
Gary Hall	23	F	6–6	230	Junior	Tully, NY	0.4	0.4	0.4
Josh Brooks	21	F	6–5	180	Junior	Saranac, NY	0.0	0.0	0.2
