= 2002–03 Georgetown Hoyas men's basketball team =

American college basketball season

2002–03 Georgetown Hoyas men's basketball

National Invitation Tournament, Runner-Up
- Conference: Big East
- West Division
- Record: 19–15 (6–10 Big East)
- Head coach: Craig Esherick (5th season)
- Assistant coaches: Mike Riley (21st season); Ronny Thompson (5th season); Chip Simms (4th season)
- Captains: Courtland Freeman; Victor Samnick; Michael Sweetney
- Home arena: MCI Center

2002–03 Big East men's basketball standings
	Conf.				Overall
Team	W		L	PCT	W		L	PCT
East
Boston College	10	–	6	.625	19	–	12	.613
No. 23 Connecticut	10	–	6	.625	23	–	10	.697
Providence	8	–	8	.500	18	–	14	.563
Villanova	8	–	8	.500	15	–	16	.484
St. John's#	7	–	9	.438	1	–	13	.071
Miami	4	–	12	.250	11	–	17	.393
Virginia Tech*	4	–	12	.250	11	–	18	.379
West
No. 13 Syracuse	13	–	3	.813	30	–	5	.857
No. 4 Pittsburgh†	13	–	3	.813	28	–	5	.848
Seton Hall	10	–	6	.625	17	–	13	.567
No. 22 Notre Dame	10	–	6	.625	24	–	10	.706
Georgetown	6	–	10	.375	19	–	15	.559
West Virginia	5	–	11	.313	14	–	15	.483
Rutgers*	4	–	12	.250	12	–	16	.429
† 2003 Big East tournament winner As of March 31, 2003; Rankings from AP Poll #St. John's had 20 regular-season games vacated due to sanctions against the program; the school′s disputed record was 7–9, 21–13. *Did not qualify for 2003 Big East tournament.

The 2002–03 Georgetown Hoyas men's basketball team represented Georgetown University in the 2002–03 NCAA Division I college basketball season. The Hoyas were coached by Craig Esherick and played their home games at the MCI Center in Washington, DC. The Hoyas were members of the West Division of the Big East Conference. They finished the season 19–15, 6–10 in Big East play. They advanced to the quarterfinals of the 2003 Big East men's basketball tournament before losing to Syracuse. After declining to participate in the National Invitation Tournament (NIT) the previous season, they accepted an invitation to play in the 2003 NIT after failing to receive an NCAA Division I men's basketball tournament bid. Making Georgetown's fourth NIT appearance in six years, they became the second Georgetown men's basketball team in history to reach the NIT final and the first to do since the 1992–93 season, losing it to Big East rival St. John's.

== Season recap ==
With forward Harvey Thomas having transferred to Daytona Beach Community College over the offseason after his freshman year, the Hoyas began the season with only senior center Wesley Wilson and junior power forward Mike Sweetney returning from the previous season's frontcourt. Wilson opted to leave the team at midseason – although he remained in school and graduated on time in May 2003 – and as a result Sweetney, a team co-captain, carried the scoring load for the team during the year, responsible for a third of its offense. Starting all 34 games, he scored in double figures in all of them and had double-figure rebound performances 16 times, and he led the team in scoring 25 times and in rebounding in 29 games. His best performances were 38 points and 15 rebounds against Notre Dame, 32 points and 13 rebounds at Syracuse, 28 points and eight rebounds against Pittsburgh, and 31 points and 19 rebounds in a game at the MCI Center against Syracuse. He led the team in scoring in 13 of its final 15 games and in every one of its last seven games. For the season, he shot 54.7 percent from the field and 73.8 percent from the free-throw line. His average of 25.1 points per game was the second-highest in school history, behind only Allen Iverson, and his 776 points were the third highest in a single season in Georgetown history.

Junior forward Gerald Riley started all 34 games, as he would all 125 games of his collegiate career. Opposing defenses focused on stopping Sweetney, giving Riley more scoring opportunities than he had had during his first two seasons. He took advantage of those opportunities, scoring in double figures 26 times, shooting 42.2 percent overall from the field, 42.7 percent in two-pointers, and 41.5 percent from three-point range. In free throws, he shot 84.3 percent, including a perfect 43-for-43 from the line in 14 games combined, and he missed only a combined seven free throws in 16 Big East games.

Freshman forward Brandon Bowman joined the team this season and started all 34 games, averaging 24 minutes, 7.6 points, and 4.5 rebounds per game. He shot 95-for-248 (38.3%) from the field, but only 10-for-55 (18.2%) from three-point range and only 3-for-19 (15.8%) in three-pointers during Big East games. His scoring improved as the season wore on, however, and he finished fourth in scoring on the team.

Freshman guard Ashanti Cook, a high-school teammate of Bowman's, was another newcomer to the team. He was averaging 8.2 points per game and showing great promise when he suffered an ankle injury in the game against top-ranked Duke on January 8, 2003. The injury cost him a month of play, and when he returned to action it hobbled him for another month, and he scored a total of only 20 points over the final nine weeks of the regular season. Also debuting with the varsity team was sophomore forward Darrel Owens, who had sat out his freshman year in 2001–02. He saw limited time during the season, although he played in 32 of the 34 games and started one of them. His 11-point, four-rebound game at Duke was his best effort.

The team opened the season 7–0, but went 7–13 the rest of the way to finish the regular season with a 14–13 overall record, 6–10 in the Big East, and a fifth-place finish in the conference's West Division. In the 2003 Big East tournament, the Hoyas defeated Villanova in the first round. In the quarterfinals, they lost to Syracuse despite an 18-point game by Bowman.

The team's Big East tournament result left it with a 15–14 overall record, and it missed the NCAA tournament for the fifth time in six years. Instead, it received an invitation to the 2003 National Invitation Tournament (NIT), its fifth NIT invitation and fourth NIT appearance in the previous six years. (Note: Georgetown declined its invitation to the 2002 National Invitation Tournament, choosing to forgo postseason play and keep its players in class after the 2001-02 season.) Cook finally began to return to form, scoring a season-high 16 points at Tennessee in the first round of the NIT, and Bowman shot 10-for-18 (55.6%) from the field in two NIT games. The Hoyas defeated Tennessee, then won at Providence and at North Carolina to advance to the semifinals at Madison Square Garden in New York City, their deepest run in a postseason tournament since they advanced to the East Region final in the 1996 NCAA tournament. In the semifinals they defeated Minnesota – the team that had beaten them in the final game of the 1993 NIT – and advanced to the second NIT final in school history and first since 1993. As in 1993, they lost the final, succumbing to Big East rival St. John's, although the NCAA later vacated the 2003 NIT title when it was discovered that St. John's had used an ineligible player.

At the end of the season, Georgetown extended head coach Craig Esherick′s contract through 2009. However, he was destined to last only one more season with the team.

In June 2003, Mike Sweetney opted to forgo his senior year of college eligibility and enter the NBA draft, the third player – after Allen Iverson in 1996 and Victor Page in 1997 – to break with the John Thompson, Jr.-Craig Esherick era's tradition of basketball players staying a full four years and graduating.

This was the last of three seasons in which Georgetown played as a member of the Big East's West Division. For the following season, the Big East scrapped its divisions and returned to a unified structure.

== Roster ==
#	Name	Height	Weight (lbs.)	Position	Class	Hometown	Previous Team(s)
1	Brandon Bowman	6'9"	223	F	Fr.	Santa Monica, CA, U.S.	Westchester HS
2	Courtland Freeman	6'9"	228	F/C	Sr.	Myrtle Beach, SC, U.S.	Socastee HS
3	Omari Faulkner	6'6"	205	F	Jr.	Memphis, TN, U.S.	Hamilton HS
5	Drew Hall	6'2"	185	G	So.	Silver Spring, MD, U.S.	Montrose Christian School
10	RaMell Ross	6'6"	205	G/F	Jr.	Fairfax, VA, U.S.	Lake Braddock Secondary
11	Trenton Hillier	5'9"	165	G	Sr.	Chagrin Falls, OH, U.S.	Kenston HS
13	Victor Samnick	6'8"	208	F	Sr.	Douala, Cameroon	Newport Prep (Md)
20	Darrell Owens	6'7"	215	F/G	So.	Napoleonville, LA, U.S.	Assumption HS
21	Ashanti Cook	6'2"	185	G	Fr.	Inglewood, CA, U.S.	Westchester HS
22	Tony Bethel	6'1"	185	G	So.	Fort Washington, MD, U.S.	Montrose Christian School
25	Ryan Beal	6'5"	210	G	Fr.	Coral Gables, FL, U.S.	Ransom Everglades School
32	Gerald Riley	6'6"	217	G	Jr.	Milledgeville, GA, U.S.	Baldwin HS
34	Mike Sweetney	6'8"	260	F/C	Jr.	Oxon Hill, MD, U.S.	Oxon Hill HS
50	Wesley Wilson	6'11"	235	C	Sr.	Vallejo, CA, U.S.	Maine Central Institute

== Rankings ==
The team was not ranked in the Top 25 in either the AP Poll or the Coaches' Poll at any time, but was among other teams receiving votes in both polls during some weeks.

Ranking movement Legend: ██ Improvement in ranking. ██ Decrease in ranking. ██ Not ranked the previous week. RV=Others receiving votes.
Poll	Pre	Wk 1	Wk 2	Wk 3	Wk 4	Wk 5	Wk 6	Wk 7	Wk 8	Wk 9	Wk 10	Wk 11	Wk 12	Wk 13	Wk 14	Wk 15	Wk 16	WK 17	Wk 18	Wk 19	Final
AP	RV	RV	RV	RV	RV	RV	RV	RV	RV	RV										no poll	
Coaches	RV	N/A	RV	RV	RV	RV	RV		RV	RV	RV										RV

== 2002–03 Schedule and results ==
- All times are Eastern

Date time, TV	Rank^{#}	Opponent^{#}	Result	Record	Site (attendance) city, state
Preseason
Fri., Nov. 1, 2002; 7:30 p.m., none		Latvia Select	W 132–58	exhibition	McDonough Gymnasium (N/A); Washington, DC
Sun., Nov. 10, 2002; N/A, none		at Princeton	scrimmage (Note: Beginning in 2000, the National Collegiate Athletic Association (NCAA) began to permit member colleges and universities to hold scrimmages with one another in lieu of scheduling exhibition games against non-collegiate opponents. A scrimmage included referees and a clock, but NCAA rules prohibited the keeping of a score. The NCAA also prohibited advertising scrimmages or selling tickets to them. See guhoyas.com "Hoyas, Princeton Happy to Help Each Other Out," November 11, 2002. Archived March 28, 2014, at the Wayback Machine)		Jadwin Gymnasium (N/A); Princeton, NJ
Regular season
Fri., Nov. 22, 2002*; 7:30 p.m.		Grambling State	W 99–46	1–0	MCI Center (8,204); Washington, DC
Mon., Nov. 25, 2002*; 7:30pm		James Madison	W 80–60	2–0	MCI Center (7,180); Washington, DC
Sat., Nov. 30, 2002*; 1:00pm		Towson	W 81–52	3–0	MCI Center (6,107); Washington, DC
Mon., Dec. 2, 2002*; 7:30pm		Coastal Carolina	W 87–60	4–0	MCI Center (4,366); Washington, DC
Thu., Dec. 5, 2002*; 7:30pm		South Carolina	W 67–59	5–0	MCI Center (5,469); Washington, DC
Mon., Dec. 16, 2002*; 7:30pm		Norfolk State	W 84–48	6–0	MCI Center (5,447); Washington, DC
Fri., Dec. 20, 2002*; 7:30pm		Howard	W 91–66	7–0	MCI Center (7,102); Washington, DC
Sat., Dec. 28, 2002*; 2:00pm, CBS		at Virginia	L 75–79	7–1	University Hall (8,251); Charlottesville, VA
Tue., Dec. 31, 2002*; 1:00pm		VMI	W 85–48	8–1	MCI Center (6,631); Washington, DC
Wed., Jan. 8, 2003*; 7:00pm, ESPN		at No. 1 Duke	L 86–93	8–2	Cameron Indoor Stadium (9,314); Durham, NC
Sun., Jan. 12, 2003; 2:00pm		West Virginia	W 84–82 ^{OT}	9–2 (1–0)	MCI Center (8,945); Washington, DC
Mon., Jan. 14, 2003; 7:30pm		at Seton Hall	L 54–68	9–3 (1–1)	Continental Airlines Arena (7,114); East Rutherford, NJ
Sat., Jan. 18, 2003; 12:00 noon		St. John's	L 72–77	9–4 (1–2)	MCI Center (11,777); Washington, DC
Mon., Jan. 20, 2003; 8:00pm		Rutgers	W 76–66	10–4 (2–2)	MCI Center (7,644); Washington, DC
Sat., Jan. 25, 2003; 12:00 noon		at No. 2 Pittsburgh	L 64–65	10–5 (2–3)	Petersen Events Center (12,508); Pittsburgh, PA
Wed., Jan. 29, 2003; 7:30pm		Seton Hall	L 82–93 ^{OT}	10–6 (2–4)	MCI Center (7,242); Washington, DC
Sat., Feb. 1, 2003; 12:00 noon		at No. 11 Notre Dame	L 92–93 ^{2OT}	10–7 (2–5)	Edmund P. Joyce Center (11,418); Notre Dame, IN
Mon., Feb. 3, 2003; 7:00pm, ESPN		at No. 24 Syracuse; Rivalry	L 80–88	10–8 (2–6)	Carrier Dome (20,702); Syracuse, NY
Sat., Feb. 8, 2003*; 1:00pm, CBS		UCLA	L 70–71	10–9	MCI Center (14,227); Washington, DC
Tue., Feb. 11, 2003; 7:00pm		at Rutgers	L 59–66	10–10 (2–7)	Louis Brown Athletic Center (6,831); Piscataway, NJ
Sat., Feb. 15, 2003; 4:00pm		at Virginia Tech	W 85–73	11–10 (3–7)	Cassell Coliseum (4,857); Blacksburg, VA
Tue., Feb. 18, 2003; 7:00pm, ESPN		No. 9 Pittsburgh	L 67–82	11–11 (3–8)	MCI Center (7,242); Washington, DC
Sat., Feb. 22, 2003; 12:00 noon, ESPN		at Miami	W 74–72	12–11 (4–8)	Convocation Center (3,314); Coral Gables, FL
Tue., Feb. 25, 2003; 7:30pm		Providence	W 71–56	13–11 (5–8)	MCI Center (6,716); Washington, DC
Sat., Mar. 1, 2003; 1:00pm, ABC		No. 15 Syracuse; Rivalry	L 84–93	13–12 (5–9)	MCI Center (17,352); Washington, DC
Mon., Mar. 3, 2003; 7:00pm		at West Virginia	W 69–67	14–12 (6–9)	WVU Coliseum (7,568); Morgantown, WV
Sat., Mar. 9, 2003; 7:00pm, CBS		No. 16 Notre Dame	L 80–86	14–13 (6–10)	MCI Center (17,875); Washington, DC
Big East tournament
Wed., Mar. 12, 2003; 7:00pm, ESPN/ESPN2		vs. Villanova; First Round	W 46–41	15–13	Madison Square Garden (19,528); New York, NY
Wed., Mar. 13, 2003; 7:00pm, ESPN/ESPN2		vs. No. 11 Syracuse; Quarterfinal/Rivalry	L 57–68	15–14	Madison Square Garden (19,173); New York, NY
National Invitation Tournament
Tue., Mar. 18, 2003; 7:00pm		at Tennessee; First Round	W 70–60	16–14	Thompson-Boling Arena (3,011); Knoxville, TN
Mon., Mar. 24, 2003; 7:30pm		at Providence; Second round	W 67–58	17–14	Dunkin Donuts Center (7,340); Providence, RI
Wed., Mar. 26, 2003; 7:00pm		at North Carolina; Quarterfinal	W 79–74	18–14	Dean Smith Center (15,043); Chapel Hill, NC
Tue., Apr. 1, 2003; 7:00pm		vs. Minnesota; Semifinal	W 88–74	19–14	Madison Square Garden (10,880); New York, NY
Thu., Apr. 3, 2003; 8:00pm		vs. St. John's; Final	L 67–70	19–15	Madison Square Garden (12,406); New York, NY
*Non-conference game. ^{#}Rankings from AP Poll. (#) Tournament seedings in parentheses.
