= 2002–03 Notre Dame Fighting Irish men's basketball team =

American college basketball season

2002–03 Notre Dame Fighting Irish men's basketball

NCAA tournament, Sweet Sixteen
- Conference: Big East Conference

Ranking
- Coaches: No. 15
- AP: No. 22
- Record: 24–10 (10–6 Big East)
- Head coach: Mike Brey (3rd season)
- Assistant coaches: Anthony Solomon; 3rd
- Home arena: Joyce Center

2002–03 Big East men's basketball standings
	Conf.				Overall
Team	W		L	PCT	W		L	PCT
East
Boston College	10	–	6	.625	19	–	12	.613
No. 23 Connecticut	10	–	6	.625	23	–	10	.697
Providence	8	–	8	.500	18	–	14	.563
Villanova	8	–	8	.500	15	–	16	.484
St. John's#	7	–	9	.438	1	–	13	.071
Miami	4	–	12	.250	11	–	17	.393
Virginia Tech*	4	–	12	.250	11	–	18	.379
West
No. 13 Syracuse	13	–	3	.813	30	–	5	.857
No. 4 Pittsburgh†	13	–	3	.813	28	–	5	.848
Seton Hall	10	–	6	.625	17	–	13	.567
No. 22 Notre Dame	10	–	6	.625	24	–	10	.706
Georgetown	6	–	10	.375	19	–	15	.559
West Virginia	5	–	11	.313	14	–	15	.483
Rutgers*	4	–	12	.250	12	–	16	.429
† 2003 Big East tournament winner As of March 31, 2003; Rankings from AP Poll #St. John's had 20 regular-season games vacated due to sanctions against the program; the school′s disputed record was 7–9, 21–13. *Did not qualify for 2003 Big East tournament.

The 2002–03 Notre Dame Fighting Irish Men's Basketball Team represented the University of Notre Dame in the 2002–03 NCAA Division I men's basketball season. Led by head coach Mike Brey, the Irish finished with a record of 24–10 and battled their way to the Sweet Sixteen of the 2003 NCAA Division I men's basketball tournament.

== Schedule ==
Date time, TV	Rank^{#}	Opponent^{#}	Result	Record	Site city, state
11/17/2002*		Belmont	W 76–48	1–0	Joyce Center; South Bend, IN
11/18/2002*		IUPUI	W 89–45	2–0	Joyce Center; South Bend, IN
11/22/2002*		Bucknell	W 73–42	3–0	Joyce Center; South Bend, IN
11/25/2002*		vs. Furman; Guardians Classic Semifinals	W 75–50	4–0	Municipal Auditorium; Kansas City, MO
11/26/2002*		vs. Creighton; Guardians Classic Final	L 75–80	4–1	Municipal Auditorium; Kansas City, MO
11/30/2002*		Albany	W 90–55	5–1	Joyce Center; South Bend, IN
12/2/2002*		No. 13 Marquette	W 92–71	6–1	Joyce Center; South Bend, IN
12/7/2002*		vs. No. 9 Maryland; BB&T Classic	W 79–67	7–1	Verizon Center; Washington D.C.
12/8/2002*		vs. No. 2 Texas; BB&T Classic	W 98–92	8–1	Verizon Center; Washington D.C.
12/14/2002*	No. 10	DePaul	W 102–71	9–1	Joyce Center; South Bend, IN
12/22/2002*	No. 9	Canisius	W 93–75	10–1	Joyce Center; South Bend, IN
12/30/2002*	No. 8	Vanderbilt	W 76–63	11–1	Joyce Center; South Bend, IN
1/4/2003*	No. 6	vs. Valparaiso	W 55–53	12–1	BankUnited Center; Coral Gables, FL
1/6/2003	No. 5	at No. 2 Pittsburgh	L 55–72	12–2	Petersen Events Center; Pittsburgh, PA
1/12/2003	No. 5	Seton Hall	W 74–64	13–2	Joyce Center; South Bend, IN
1/14/2003	No. 10	Rutgers	W 68–57	14–2	Joyce Center; South Bend, IN
1/18/2003*	No. 10	at No. 16 Kentucky	L 73–88	14–3	Rupp Arena; Lexington, KY
1/21/2003	No. 16	at Providence	W 71–65	15–3	Dunkin' Donuts Center; Providence, RI
1/25/2003	No. 16	at Boston College	W 101–96 ^{OT}	16–3	Conte Forum; Chestnut Hill, MA
1/29/2003	No. 11	West Virginia	W 88–69	17–3	Joyce Center; South Bend, IN
2/1/2003	No. 11	Georgetown	W 93–92 ^{2OT}	18–3	Joyce Center; South Bend, IN
2/5/2003	No. 10	at Seton Hall	L 72–78	18–4	IZOD Center; East Rutherford, NJ
2/9/2003	No. 10	No. 4 Pittsburgh	W 66–64	19–4	Joyce Center; South Bend, IN
2/15/2003	No. 10	at No. 17 Syracuse	L 80–82	19–5	Carrier Dome; Syracuse, NY
2/18/2003	No. 12	at West Virginia	W 56–55	20–5	WVU Coliseum; Morgantown, WV
2/22/2003	No. 12	Virginia Tech	W 98–76	21–5	Joyce Center; South Bend, IN
2/24/2003	No. 9	UConn	L 79–87	21–6	Joyce Center; South Bend, IN
3/1/2003	No. 9	at Rutgers	L 82–95	21–7	Louis Brown Athletic Center; Piscataway, NJ
3/4/2003	No. 16	No. 12 Syracuse	L 88–92	21–8	Joyce Center; South Bend, IN
3/8/2003	No. 17	at Georgetown	W 86–80	22–8	Verizon Center; Washington D.C.
3/12/2003	No. 17	vs. St. John's; Big East tournament first round	L 80–83	22–9	Madison Square Garden; New York, NY
3/20/2003*	No. 5	vs. No. 12 UW-Milwaukee; First Round	W 70–69	23–9	RCA Dome; Indianapolis, IN
3/22/2003*	No. 5	vs. No. 4 Illinois; Second Round	W 68–60	24–9	RCA Dome; Indianapolis, IN
3/27/2003*	No. 5	vs. No. 1 Arizona; Sweet Sixteen	L 71–88	24–10	Honda Center; Anaheim, CA
*Non-conference game. ^{#}Rankings from AP Poll. (#) Tournament seedings in parentheses.

== Roster ==
2002–03 Notre Dame Fighting Irish men's basketball team
Players
Coaches

Pos.	#	Name	Height	Weight	Year	Hometown
G	13	Matt Carroll	6 ft 6 in (1.98 m)	212 lb (96 kg)	Sr	Horsham, Pennsylvania
F	21	Danny Miller	6 ft 8 in (2.03 m)	220 lb (100 kg)	Sr	Mt. Holly, New Jersey
G	2	Chris Quinn	6 ft 2 in (1.88 m)	178 lb (81 kg)	Fr	Dublin, Ohio
C	50	Tom Timmermans	6 ft 11 in (2.11 m)	253 lb (115 kg)	Jr	Driehuis, Netherlands

Head coach

- Mike Brey

Assistant coach(es)

- Anthony Solomon

Legend

- (C) Team captain
- (S) Suspended
- (I) Ineligible
- (W) Walk-on
- Injured
- Current redshirt

Roster
