= Michael Sweetney =

American basketball player (1982–2026)

- Sweetney with the New York Knicks

Personal information
- Born: October 25, 1982 Washington, D.C., U.S.
- Died: September 17, 2026 (aged 43) Newark, New Jersey, U.S.
- Listed height: 6 ft 8 in (2.03 m)
- Listed weight: 270 lb (122 kg)

Career information
- High school: Oxon Hill (Oxon Hill, Maryland)
- College: Georgetown (2000–2003)
- NBA draft: 2003: 1st round, 9th overall pick
- Drafted by: New York Knicks
- Playing career: 2003–2017
- Position: Power forward
- Number: 50, 60
- Coaching career: 2019–2026

Career history

Playing
- 2003–2005: New York Knicks
- 2005–2007: Chicago Bulls
- 2009–2010: Shaanxi Kylins
- 2010: Erie BayHawks
- 2010: Cangrejeros de Santurce
- 2010: Metros de Santiago
- 2010–2011: Club Biguá
- 2011: Cangrejeros de Santurce
- 2012: Vaqueros de Bayamón
- 2013: Guaiqueríes de Margarita
- 2013: Vaqueros de Bayamón
- 2014: Club Atlético Atenas
- 2014: Brujos de Guayama
- 2015–2017: Urunday Universitario

Career highlights
- Second-team All-American – NABC (2003); Third-team All-American – SN (2003); 2× First-team All-Big East (2002, 2003)
- Stats at NBA.com
- Stats at Basketball Reference
Medals
Men's basketball
Representing United States
FIBA U21 World Championship
Gold medal – first place	2001 Saitama	Team competition

Michael Damien Sweetney (October 25, 1982 – September 17, 2026) was an American professional basketball player who played four seasons in the National Basketball Association (NBA). He later served as an assistant coach of the Yeshiva University men's basketball team and head coach of the girls varsity basketball team at New York's Ramaz School.

== High school and college careers ==
Sweetney went to Oxon Hill High School, where he was named Washington Post All-Met Basketball Player of the Year in 2000.

He chose to play college basketball at nearby Georgetown University, continuing the program's tradition of highly skilled big men, where he averaged 18.2 points while shooting nearly 55% over his three-year collegiate career. He was especially dominant over his junior year, in which he was named Honorable Mention All-America by AP, as well as being a Naismith College Player of the Year finalist and a candidate for the John R. Wooden Award. That year, Sweetney was the only player in the nation to rank in the top 20 in scoring and rebounding.

Despite playing only three seasons for the Hoyas, as of the 2025-26 season he ranks ninth on Georgetown's career scoring list (1,750), fifth in rebounds (887) and seventh in blocks (180).

== Professional career ==
Sweetney was selected by the New York Knicks with the 9th overall pick, in the 2003 NBA draft. After a two-year stint with Knicks, during which he played 119 gamers and averaged 7.0 points per game (ppg) and 4.8 rebound per game (rpg), he was traded to the Chicago Bulls on October 4, 2005, along with Tim Thomas, Jermaine Jackson, and four draft picks for Eddy Curry and Antonio Davis and a draft pick.

He played 114 games over two seasons with the Bulls, averaging 6.0 ppg and 4.1 rpg, but battled weight issues, which had followed him his whole career. The Chicago Tribune reported that if Sweetney did not lose a certain amount of weight, his career could be in danger.

Sweetney's final NBA game ever ended up being in Game 2 of the 2007 Eastern Conference Semifinals on May 7, 2007. In that game, the Bulls lost 108-87 to the Detroit Pistons while Sweetney recorded two points in three minutes of playing time.

In the summer of 2009 Sweetney played with the Boston Celtics summer league team. He was invited to attend training camp in October 2009 to try out with the Celtics and attempt to resume an NBA career, but was waived on October 22. In early December 2011, Sweetney rejoined the Boston Celtics for training camp, but he was cut on December 22, 2011.

In his post-NBA career, Sweetney spent a decade playing for teams in American minor leagues and abroad, including stints in China, Puerto Rico, the Dominican Republic, Uruguay, and Venezuela. Sweetney competed for Team City of Gods in The Basketball Tournament. He was a center on the 2015 team who made it to the semifinals, losing to Overseas Elite 84–71. Sweetney later ran Tamir Goodman's basketball camp.

== Coaching career ==
In 2019, Sweetney became an assistant coach for the Yeshiva University men's basketball team before departing in 2023 and head coach of the girls' varsity basketball team at Ramaz School.

In August 2026, Sweetney was hired as the head boys basketball coach at the Golda Och Academy in West Orange, New Jersey.

== Death ==
Sweetney died on September 17, 2026, at the age of 43. His death was announced by his widow, India.

== Career statistics ==
Legend
GP	Games played	GS	Games started	MPG	Minutes per game
FG%	Field goal percentage	3P%	3-point field goal percentage	FT%	Free throw percentage
RPG	Rebounds per game	APG	Assists per game	SPG	Steals per game
BPG	Blocks per game	PPG	Points per game	**Bold**	Career high

=== Regular season ===
Year	Team	GP	GS	MPG	FG%	3P%	FT%	RPG	APG	SPG	BPG	PPG
2003–04	New York	42	1	16.8	.522	.000	.744	4.8	.5	.4	.3	7.0
2004–05	New York	77	28	19.6	.531	.000	.749	5.4	.6	.4	.4	8.4
2005–06	Chicago	66	44	18.5	.450	—	.652	5.3	.9	.3	.8	8.1
2006–07	Chicago	48	0	8.0	.433	—	.561	2.5	.6	.2	.2	3.2
Career		233	73	15.5	.485	.000	.689	4.5	.6	.3	.5	6.5

=== Playoffs ===
Year	Team	GP	GS	MPG	FG%	3P%	FT%	RPG	APG	SPG	BPG	PPG
2004	New York	4	0	14.3	.545	—	.667	2.5	.0	.0	.3	4.0
2006	Chicago	6	6	20.0	.412	—	.789	5.5	1.2	.5	1.0	7.2
2007	Chicago	1	0	3.0	.500	—	.000	2.5	.0	.0	.0	2.0
Career		11	6	16.4	.447	—	.704	3.9	.6	.3	.6	5.5

=== College ===
Year	Team	GP	GS	MPG	FG%	3P%	FT%	RPG	APG	SPG	BPG	PPG
2000–01	Georgetown	33	33	24.2	.516	.000	.619	7.4	1.8	.8	.7	12.8
2001–02	Georgetown	29	28	30.4	**.567**	.000	**.788**	10.0	1.7	.9	1.7	19.0
2002–03	Georgetown	**34**	**34**	**32.4**	.547	.000	.738	**10.4**	**1.9**	**1.5**	**3.2**	**22.8**
Career		96	95	29.0	.544	.000	.727	9.2	1.8	1.1	1.9	18.2
