= Chevon Troutman =

American basketball player (born 1981)

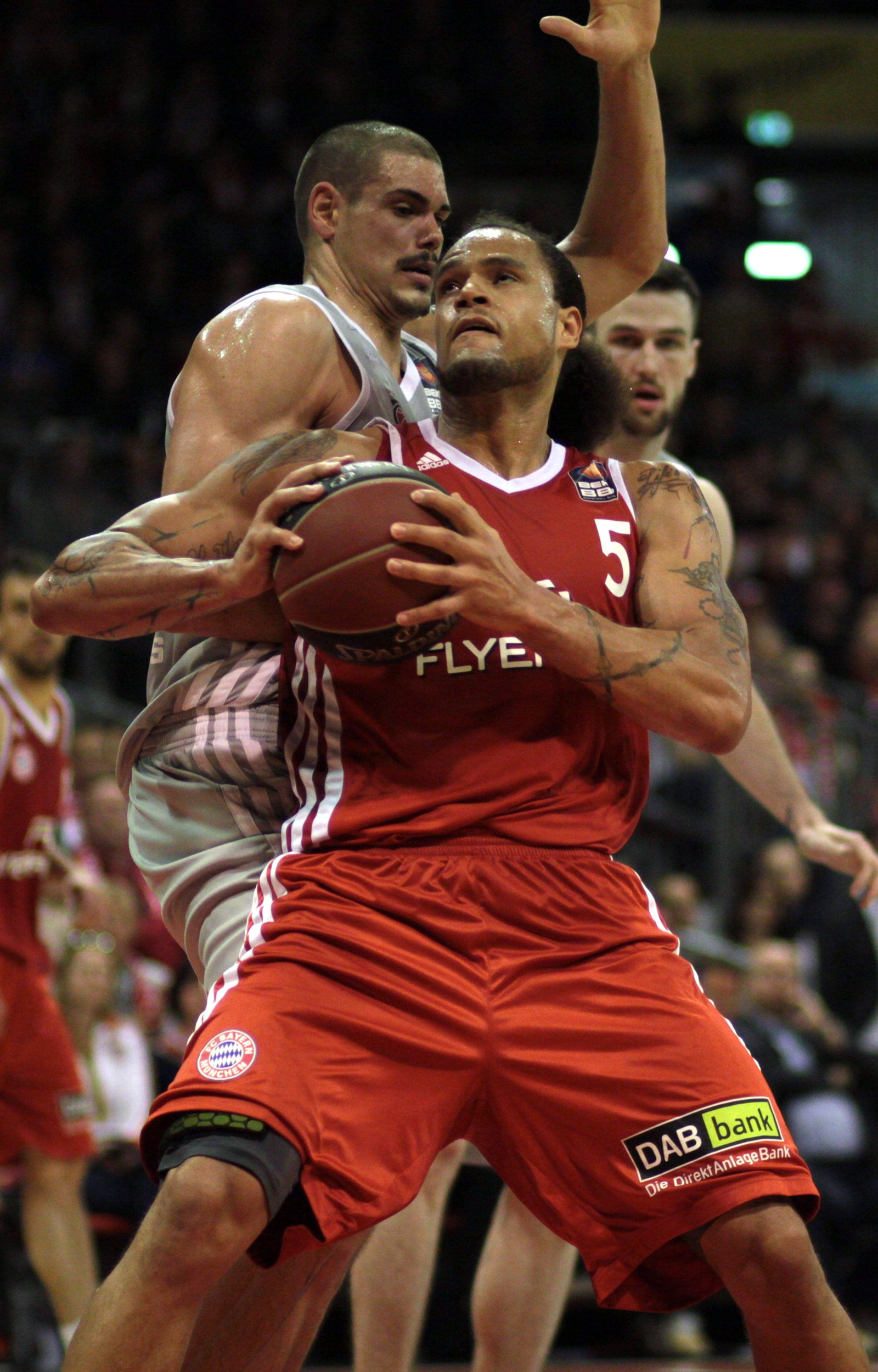
- Troutman with Bayern Munich

No. 8 – Regatas Corrientes
- Position: Power forward
- League: Liga Nacional de Básquet

Personal information
- Born: November 25, 1981 (age 44) Williamsport, Pennsylvania
- Listed height: 6 ft 8 in (2.03 m)
- Listed weight: 240 lb (109 kg)

Career information
- High school: Williamsport Area (Williamsport, Pennsylvania)
- College: Pittsburgh (2001–2005)
- NBA draft: 2005: undrafted
- Playing career: 2005–present

Career history
- 2005: CDP Domingo Paulino Santiago
- 2005: Metros de Santiago
- 2005–2006: Basket Livorno
- 2006–2009: ASVEL Basket
- 2009–2011: Scandone Avellino
- 2011–2014: Bayern Munich
- 2014–2015: Stelmet Zielona Góra
- 2015–2016: Orléans Loiret Basket
- 2016-2018: Regatas Corrientes

Career highlights
- Polish League champion (2015); Polish Cup winner (2015); German League champion (2014); 2x All-German League Team (2012, 2013); French League champion (2009); French Cup winner (2008); 2× French League All-Star (2008–2009); German League All-Star (2011); First-team All-Big East (2005)

Chevon Stephen Ray Troutman (born November 25, 1981) is an American professional basketball player. He is a 6-foot-8-inch (2.03 m) tall power forward, who plays for Regatas Corrientes of the Liga Nacional de Básquet.

== Career statistics ==
=== Domestic leagues ===
Season	Team	League	GP	MPG	FG%	3P%	FT%	RPG	APG	SPG	BPG	PPG
2005	Metros de Santiago	Dominican LNB	11	–	–	–	–	7.8	–	–	.9	17.4
2005–06	TDShop.it Livorno	LBA	34	26.9	.648	.250	.622	7.2	1.0	2.3	.4	15.0
2006–07	ASVEL Basket	LNB Pro A	35	25.7	.659	.176	.682	6.9	1.4	1.2	.5	14.8
2007–08	ASVEL Basket	LNB Pro A	34	23.4	.649	.292	.766	6.3	1.3	1.2	.2	14.2
2008–09	ASVEL Basket	LNB Pro A	36	23.5	.606	.360	.728	5.7	1.4	1.4	.3	10.9
2009–10	Air Avellino	LBA	28	28.0	.606	.154	.707	7.8	.7	2.6	.6	12.7
2010–11	Air Avellino	LBA	16	29.9	.611	.375	.690	8.3	.6	2.7	.7	14.6
2011–12	Air Avellino	LBA	1	30.0	.615	--	1.000	9.0	.0	2.0	.0	18.0
2011–12	Bayern Munich	Basketball Bundesliga	35	24.9	.648	.400	.731	7.0	1.1	.8	.3	13.5
2012–13	Bayern Munich	Basketball Bundesliga	37	22.5	.658	.333	.779	5.6	.9	.6	.2	12.2
2013–14	Bayern Munich	Basketball Bundesliga	36	14.7	.591	.229	.805	3.9	.8	.4	.1	6.6
2014–15	Stelmet Zielona Góra	Polish PLK	40	16.2	.628	.387	.600	4.9	.7	.8	.3	6.7
