= Brandin Knight =

American basketball player and coach (born 1981)

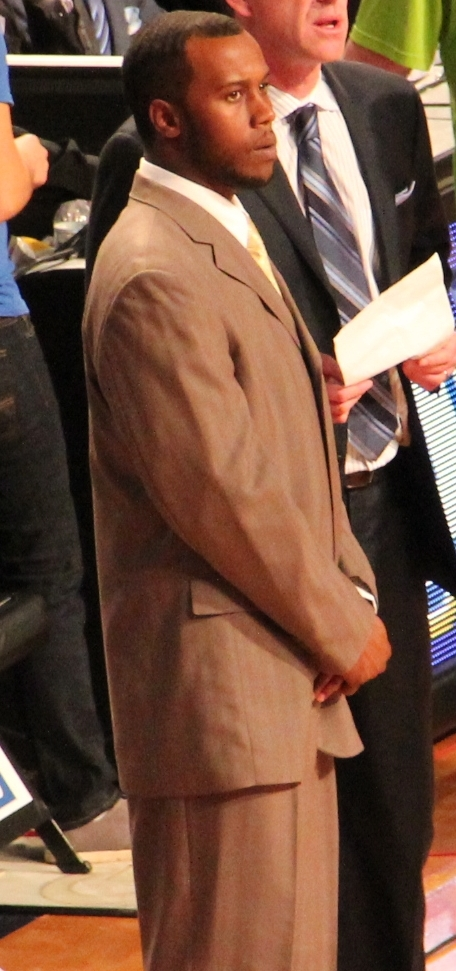
- Knight in 2014

Rutgers Scarlet Knights
- Title: Associate head coach
- League: Big Ten Conference

Personal information
- Born: December 16, 1981 (age 44) Livingston, New Jersey, U.S.
- Listed height: 6 ft 0 in (1.83 m)
- Listed weight: 180 lb (82 kg)

Career information
- High school: Seton Hall Prep (West Orange, New Jersey)
- College: Pittsburgh (1999–2003)
- NBA draft: 2003: undrafted
- Playing career: 2003–2005
- Position: Point guard
- Number: 10
- Coaching career: 2008–present

Career history

Playing
- 2003–2005: Asheville Altitude
- 2005: Houston Rockets

Coaching
- 2008–2016: Pittsburgh (assistant)
- 2016–2021: Rutgers (assistant)
- 2021–present: Rutgers (assoc. head coach)

Career highlights
- Second-team All-American – SN (2002); Third-team All-American – AP (2002); AP Honorable mention All-American (2003); First-team All-Big East (2002); Second-team All-Big East (2003); Big East co-Player of the Year (2002); No. 20 retired by Pittsburgh Panthers
- Stats at NBA.com
- Stats at Basketball Reference

Brandin Adar Knight (born December 16, 1981) is an American basketball coach and former player who is associate head coach and acting head coach for the Rutgers Scarlet Knights.

== Early life ==
Knight grew up in East Orange, New Jersey, and played high school ball at Seton Hall Preparatory School in West Orange, New Jersey. He is the brother of Brevin Knight.

== College career ==
A 6'0" point guard, Knight played for the Pittsburgh Panthers men's basketball team, where he scored 1,440 career points. He was one of ten players named to the 2002–03 Wooden All-American team and was Associated Press honorable mention All-American that same season. Knight was also selected as an Associated Press Third Team All-American and Sporting News Second Team All-American in 2002–02.

In 2001–02, Knight was named Big East Conference co-Player of the Year, Big East Most Improved Player, First Team All-Big East, and was named to the All-Big East tournament team. Knight achieved Second Team All-Big East honors in 2002–04. He was a two-time United States Basketball Writers Association (USBWA) All-Region selection (2001–02 and 2003–04) and a USBWA/NABC All-District Team selection in 2001–02. He won the USBWA Region Player of the Year in 2001–02.

Knight finished his career at Pitt holding the school records for career assists (785), career assist average (6.2 assists per game), career steals (298), season assists (251 in 2001–02), and season minutes played (1,284 in 2001–02). Knight's #20 jersey was retired by Pitt prior to the Marquette game on March 4, 2009.

== Professional career ==
He played professionally for two seasons with the Asheville Altitude of the NBDL. Knight signed a contract with the NBA's Houston Rockets, but suffered an injury two weeks later that effectively ended his playing career.

=== Post-playing career ===
Knight worked as Director of Basketball Operations for the Pittsburgh men's basketball team during the 2007–08 season and was promoted in June 2008 to an assistant coach following the departure of Orlando Antigua to the University of Memphis' coaching staff.

On April 13, 2016, Knight was officially introduced as the new assistant head coach for Rutgers following eight seasons at Pittsburgh. He signed a four-year extension with Rutgers in April 2024.

In September 2026, Knight was named the acting head coach of Rutgers while head coach Steve Pikiell took a leave of absence for cancer treatment.
