= LaVell Blanchard =

American basketball player

Personal information
- Born: February 23, 1981 (age 45) Ann Arbor, Michigan, U.S.
- Listed height: 6 ft 7 in (2.01 m)
- Listed weight: 231 lb (105 kg)

Career information
- High school: Pioneer (Ann Arbor, Michigan)
- College: Michigan (1999–2003)
- NBA draft: 2003: undrafted
- Playing career: 2003–2013
- Position: Forward

Career history
- 2003–2005: Viola Reggio Calabria (Italy)
- 2005–2006: EWE Baskets Oldenburg (Germany)
- 2007: ASVEL Basket (France)
- 2007–2008: Stade Clermontois BA (France)
- 2008–2009: AEL Limassol (Cyprus)
- 2009–2010: Khimik Yuzhne (Ukraine)
- 2010: Igokea (BiH)
- 2010–2011: Torpan Pojat (Finland)
- 2012: Santa Cruz/Rados/Pioneer (Brazil)
- 2012: Estudiantes de Bahía Blanca (Argentina)
- 2013: 9 de Julio de Río Tercero (Argentina)

Career highlights
- Eurobasket.com All-Bosnia and Herzegovina League (2010); Cyprus League Cup winner (2009); Bundesliga All-Star (2006); 4x All-Big Ten Conference (1st team: 2003; 2nd team: 2001; 3rd team: 2000 and 2002); Big Ten Conference Freshman of the Year (2000); Gatorade Player of the Year (1999); McDonald's All-American (1999); First-team Parade All-American (1999)

LaVell DeAaron Blanchard (February 23, 1981) is an American former professional basketball player. He played in several leagues in Brazil, France, Germany, Italy, Bosnia and Herzegovina and Ukraine. He was a four-time All-Big Ten Conference performer and 2000 Big Ten Freshman of the Year for the Michigan Wolverines men's basketball team. He is known for having been the fifth player to ever lead a National Collegiate Athletic Association team in both scoring and rebounding four times. He earned the Gatorade Player of the Year while playing for Pioneer High School in Ann Arbor, Michigan, the home of the University of Michigan.

== Early life ==
As a junior at Pioneer High School, he was a 1998 Boys Basketball All-USA honorable mention. As a senior, Blanchard held a 3.8 grade point average and led the boys basketball team to a Class A Michigan High School Athletic Association state championship by averaging 27.7 points, 13 rebounds, 4.0 assists, 2.0 steals and 1.5 blocks. He was a first team 1999 USA Today All-USA high school basketball team selection along with Donnell Harvey, Jay Williams, Joseph Forte and DerMarr Johnson. He was named the boys basketball National Gatorade Player of the Year. He was also a McDonald's All-American and a Magic Roundball Classic selection. He was one of the top 5 players available in the April late National Letter of Intent signing period. Blanchard was considered destined to play for Virginia until assistant coach Bobby Gonzalez took the head coaching job at Manhattan. He then considered California and Penn State.

== College career ==
Blanchard was one of three freshman starters for Michigan along with future NBA veteran Jamal Crawford. Blanchard led the team with 404 points and 221 rebounds in 28 games played, although Crawford had a higher average points per game. He earned the 2000 Big Ten Freshman of the Year Award and was a 3rd team All-Big Ten Conference player according to the media and was co-Freshman of the Year (Brian Cook) according to the coaches for the 1999–2000 Michigan Wolverines men's basketball team.

As a sophomore, he posted a career-high 30 points to lead Michigan past the 14th ranked Iowa Hawkeyes 70–69. Blanchard led the team with 499 points and 235 rebounds in 28 games played. He was a 2nd team All-Big Ten performer for the 2000–01 team.

He was one of 14 finalists for the 12-man 2001 FIBA Under-21 World Championship USA Basketball team, but he did not make the final roster. He was one of 10 preseason Playboy All-Americans. He posted a career-high five three point shots and a season-high 26 points in the first round of the 2002 Big Ten Conference Men's Basketball Tournament in a 72–51 victory over Northwestern. Blanchard led the team with 430 points and 184 rebounds in 29 games played. He was a 3rd team All-Big Ten performer for the 2001–02 team.

On January 22, 2003, he scored 24 second-half points on his way to a 28-point night when Michigan extended its winning streak to 12 straight games with a 75–63 win over Minnesota. Michigan had trailed by 5 points near the middle of the second half. Michigan would extend the win streak to 13, getting off to a 6–0 conference start before losing. The team continued to battle for the conference title well into February. They took sole possession of first place when Blanchard contributed 20 points in a 78–67 victory over 24th ranked Purdue on February 19. Blanchard led the team with 485 points and 205 rebounds in 30 games played. He was a 1st team All-Big Ten performer and co-captain for the 2002–03 team. During his senior season, Michigan was banned from postseason play due to the University of Michigan basketball scandal. His 43.3 Three Point Field Goal Percentage led the Big Ten Conference in conference games.

Blanchard was the fifth player to lead an NCAA team in scoring and rebounding four times. Prior to the 2003 NBA draft, Blanchard had an official workout with the Atlanta Hawks. Blanchard was considered an unlikely late second round selection despite his solid character.

== Professional career ==
He spent his first two professional seasons playing for Viola Reggio Calabria in the Lega Basket Serie A. He played the 2005–06 season with EWE Baskets Oldenburg of the Bundesliga and was a participant in the 2006 German Bundesliga All-Star Game. In October 2006, he signed with the Toronto Raptors. After failing to make the team he spent the rest of the season with ASVEL Basket of the Ligue Nationale de Basketball and then the 2007–08 season with Stade Clermontois BA, which is a lower division French team. He participated in the 2008–09 EuroChallenge as well as the Cypriot League with Proteas EKA AEL. In 2009, he was a Cyprus League Regular Season Champion, Cyprus League Cup winner and a Eurobasket.com Cyprus League All-Imports Team selection. He then moved to Ukraine. He began the 2009–10 season with BC Khimik in Yuzhne, Ukraine, but moved to Bosnia to play with KK Igokea in Aleksandrovac, Bosnia and Herzegovina. He was an honorable mention Eurobasket.com 2009–10 All-Bosnia and Herzegovina League Honoree for Igokea. He spent 2010–11 playing with BC Torpan Pojat of Helsinki, Finland in the Korisliiga. In March 2012, he signed with Santa Cruz/Rados/Pioneer of the Brazil Gaucha League. Blanchard joined Estudiantes de Bahía Blanca for the 2012–13 Liga Nacional de Básquet season. He then played briefly with 9 de Julio de Río Tercero also of Liga Nacional de Básquet until his services were discontinued in February.
