= 2002–03 Michigan State Spartans men's basketball team =

American college basketball season

2002–03 Michigan State Spartans men's basketball

NCAA tournament, Elite Eight
- Conference: Big Ten Conference

Ranking
- Coaches: No. 18
- Record: 22–13 (10–6 Big Ten)
- Head coach: Tom Izzo (8th season)
- Associate head coach: Brian Gregory (4th season)
- Assistant coaches: Mike Garland (7th season); Mark Montgomery (2nd season)
- Captains: Aloysius Anagonye; Adam Ballinger
- Home arena: Breslin Center

2002–03 Big Ten Conference men's basketball standings
	Conf.				Overall
Team	W		L	PCT	W		L	PCT
No. 21 Wisconsin	12	–	4	.750	24	–	8	.750
No. 11 Illinois †	11	–	5	.688	25	–	7	.781
Purdue	10	–	6	.625	19	–	11	.633
Michigan State	10	–	6	.625	22	–	13	.629
Michigan	10	–	6	.625	18	–	12	.600
Indiana	8	–	8	.500	21	–	13	.618
Minnesota	8	–	8	.500	19	–	14	.576
Iowa	7	–	9	.438	17	–	14	.548
Ohio State	7	–	9	.438	17	–	15	.531
Northwestern	3	–	13	.188	12	–	17	.414
Penn State	2	–	14	.125	7	–	21	.250
† 2003 Big Ten tournament winner Rankings from AP poll

The 2002–03 Michigan State Spartans men's basketball team represented Michigan State University in the 2002–03 NCAA Division I men's basketball season. The Spartans, led by coach Tom Izzo in his eighth year, played their home games at the Breslin Center in East Lansing, Michigan and were members of the Big Ten Conference. MSU finished the season with a record of 22–13, 10–6 to finish in a tie for third in Big Ten play. The Spartans received a bid to the NCAA tournament for the sixth consecutive year and advanced to the Elite Eight before losing to Texas.

== Previous season ==
The Spartans finished the 2001–02 season with an overall record of 19–12, 10–6 to finish in fourth place in the Big Ten. Michigan State received a No. 10 seed in the NCAA tournament, their fifth straight trip to the Tournament, and were eliminated in the First Round by NC State.

The Spartans lost sophomore Marcus Taylor (16.8 points and 5.3 assists per game) to the NBA draft following the season.

== Season summary ==
The Spartans were led by sophomores Chris Hill (13.7 points per game) and Alan Anderson (9.8 points per game). The Spartans, despite the loss of their leading scorer, Marcus Taylor, began the season ranked No. 9 in the country. After two early wins, MSU suffered losses to Villanova and Oklahoma State in the Great Alaska Shootout. They bounced back with wins over No. 22 Virginia and No. 12 Kentucky in Lexington. After winning six consecutive games, they were shocked by Toledo and fell to No. 10 Oklahoma in the All College Classic. Michigan State finished the non-conference schedule at 8–4 and ranked No. 25 in the country.

MSU began the Big Ten regular season losing four of their first six games and fell out of the rankings. The Spartans rebounded thereafter to beat No. 19 Indiana and No. 13 Illinois. A non-conference loss to No. 15 Syracuse followed a 30-point blowout loss to No. 20 Illinois. MSU finished the conference schedule with four straight wins to tie for third place at 10–6 in conference and 18–11 overall. Michigan State beat Purdue in the Big Ten tournament quarterfinals, but fell to Ohio State in the semifinals.

The Spartans received a bid to the NCAA tournament for the sixth consecutive year. MSU received a No. 7 seed in the South Region. A win over Colorado in the First Round was followed by a rout of No. 10 Florida to reach the Sweet Sixteen for the fifth time in six years. The Spartans defeated No. 17 Maryland to advance to the Elite Eight for the fourth time in five years. However, MSU fell to No. 5-ranked and No. 1-seeded Texas in the Regional Final.

== Roster ==
2002–03 Michigan State Spartans men's basketball team
Name	Class	Pos	Height	Summary
Maurice Ager	FR	G	6'5"	6.7 Pts, 2.3 Reb, 0.6 Ast
Aloysius Anagonye	SR	F	6'8"	7.4 Pts, 5.3 Reb, 1.1 Ast
Alan Anderson	SO	F	6'6"	9.8 Pts, 3.7 Reb, 3.3 Ast
Jason Andreas	JR	C	6'10"	1.0 Pts, 1.3 Reb, 0.1 Ast
Adam Ballinger	SR	F	6'9"	5.5 Pts, 3.0 Reb, 1.0 Ast
Tim Bograkos	SO	G	6'2"	1.6 Pts, 1.5 Reb, 0.8 Ast
Paul Davis	FR	C	6'11"	7.8 Pts, 4.7 Reb, 0.4 Ast
Andy Harvey	FR	G	6'5"	0.0 Pts, 0.2 Reb, 0.0 Ast
Chris Hill	SO	G	6'3"	13.7 Pts, 3.4 Reb, 3.7 Ast
Rashi Johnson	JR	G	6'2"	1.0 Pts, 0.8 Reb, 1.0 Ast
Erazem Lorbek	FR	F	6'10"	6.4 Pts, 3.3 Reb, 0.6 Ast
Kelvin Torbert	SO	G	6'4"	8.7 Pts, 3.8 Reb, 1.7 Ast
Jayson Vincent	FR	G	6'4"	0.3 Pts, 0.1 Reb, 0.0 Ast
Brian Westrick	SR	F	6'5"	0.2 Pts, 0.5 Reb, 0.0 Ast
Adam Wolfe	JR	F	6'9"	1.4 Pts, 0.4 Reb, 0.2 Ast

== Schedule and results ==
Date time, TV	Rank^{#}	Opponent^{#}	Result	Record	Site city, state
Exhibition
Nov 11, 2002*	No. 9	Magic Johnson All-Stars	L 85–104		Breslin Center; East Lansing, Michigan
Nov 14, 2002*	No. 9	Nike Elite	W 56–55		Breslin Center; East Lansing, Michigan
Regular season
Nov 22, 2002*; 7:00 pm	No. 9	UNC Asheville	W 66–52	1–0	Breslin Center (14,759); East Lansing, Michigan
Nov 28, 2002*; 8:00 pm, ESPN	No. 9	vs. Montana; Great Alaska Shootout quarterfinals	W 80–60	2–0	Sullivan Arena (7,163); Anchorage, Alaska
Nov 29, 2002*; 8:00 pm, ESPN2	No. 9	vs. Villanova; Great Alaska Shootout semifinals	L 73–81	2–1	Sullivan Arena (8,029); Anchorage, Alaska
Nov 30, 2002*; 5:30 pm, ESPN2	No. 9	vs. Oklahoma State; Great Alaska Shootout third place game	L 61–64	2–2	Sullivan Arena (8,243); Anchorage, Alaska
Dec 4, 2002*; 9:00 pm, ESPN	No. 21	No. 22 Virginia; ACC–Big Ten Challenge	W 82–75	3–2	Breslin Center (14,759); East Lansing, Michigan
Dec 8, 2002*; 1:00 pm	No. 21	Cleveland State	W 79–47	4–2	Breslin Center (14,759); East Lansing, Michigan
Dec 14, 2002*; 4:00 pm, CBS	No. 21	at No. 12 Kentucky	W 71–67	5–2	Rupp Arena (23,145); Lexington, Kentucky
Dec 17, 2002*; 7:00 pm	No. 15	Loyola Chicago	W 80–54	6–2	Breslin Center (14,759); East Lansing, Michigan
Dec 21, 2002*; 1:00 pm	No. 15	South Florida	W 65–56	7–2	Breslin Center (14,759); East Lansing, Michigan
Dec 28, 2002*; 7:00 pm	No. 15	Jacksonville State	W 76–52	8–2	Breslin Center (14,759); East Lansing, Michigan
Dec 30, 2002*; 7:00 pm	No. 14	Toledo	L 76–81	8–3	Breslin Center (14,759); East Lansing, Michigan
Jan 4, 2003*; 8:05 pm	No. 14	vs. No. 10 Oklahoma; All-College Basketball Classic	L 58–60	8–4	Ford Center (18,034); Oklahoma City, Oklahoma
Jan 9, 2003; 7:00 pm	No. 25	Ohio State	W 66–55	9–4 (1–0)	Breslin Center (14,759); East Lansing, Michigan
Jan 11, 2003; 1:35 pm	No. 25	at Iowa	L 64–68	9–5 (1–1)	Carver–Hawkeye Arena (14,116); Iowa City, Iowa
Jan 14, 2003; 7:00 pm		at Purdue	L 60–72	9–6 (1–2)	Mackey Arena (10,630); West Lafayette, Indiana
Jan 18, 2003; 1:00 pm		at Minnesota	L 69–77	9–7 (1–3)	Williams Arena (14,617); Minneapolis, Minnesota
Jan 22, 2003; 6:00 pm		Penn State	W 70–36	10–7 (2–3)	Breslin Center (14,759); East Lansing, Michigan
Jan 26, 2003; 1:00 pm, CBS		at Michigan; Rivalry	L 58–60	10–8 (2–4)	Crisler Arena (13,751); Ann Arbor, Michigan
Jan 28, 2003; 7:00 pm		No. 19 Indiana	W 61–54	11–8 (3–4)	Breslin Center (14,759); East Lansing, Michigan
Feb 2, 2003; 1:00 pm, CBS		No. 13 Illinois	W 68–65	12–8 (4–4)	Breslin Center (14,759); East Lansing, Michigan
Feb 8, 2003; 7:00 pm		at Indiana	W 67–62 ^{OT}	13–8 (5–4)	Assembly Hall (17,303); Bloomington, Indiana
Feb 11, 2003; 6:00 pm		at Wisconsin	L 53–64	13–9 (5–5)	Kohl Center (17,142); Madison, Wisconsin
Feb 15, 2003; 3:00 pm		Northwestern	W 64–51	14–9 (6–5)	Breslin Center (14,759); East Lansing, Michigan
Feb 18, 2003; 6:00 pm		No. 20 Illinois	L 40–70	14–10 (6–6)	Assembly Hall (16,500); Champaign, Illinois
Feb 23, 2003*; 2:00 pm, CBS		No. 15 Syracuse	L 75–76	14–11	Breslin Center (14,759); East Lansing, Michigan
Feb 26, 2003; 7:00 pm		Minnesota	W 71–61	15–11 (7–6)	Breslin Center (14,759); East Lansing, Michigan
Mar 1, 2003; 2:34 pm		Purdue	W 69–61	16–11 (8–6)	Breslin Center (14,759); East Lansing, Michigan
Mar 5, 2003; 8:00 pm		Iowa	W 82–54	17–11 (9–6)	Breslin Center (14,759); East Lansing, Michigan
Mar 8, 2003; 12:17 pm		at Ohio State	W 72–58	18–11 (10–6)	Value City Arena (19,200); Columbus, Ohio
Big Ten tournament
Mar 14, 2003; 1:30 pm, ESPN	(5)	vs. (4) Purdue quarterfinals	W 54–42	19–11	United Center (17,843); Chicago, Illinois
Mar 15, 2003; 12:40 pm, CBS	(5)	vs. (8) Ohio State semifinals	L 54–55	19–12	United Center (20,248); Chicago, Illinois
NCAA tournament
Mar 21, 2003*; 7:10 pm, CBS	(7 S)	vs. (10 S) Colorado; First Round	W 79–64	20–12	St. Pete Times Forum (20,224); Tampa, Florida
Mar 23, 2003*; 7:07 pm, CBS	(7 S)	vs. (2 S) No. 10 Florida; Second Round	W 68–46	21–12	St. Pete Times Forum (21,304); Tampa, Florida
Mar 28, 2003*; 8:57 pm, CBS	(7 S)	vs. (6 S) No. 17 Maryland; Sweet Sixteen	W 60–58	22–12	Alamodome (33,009); San Antonio, Texas
Mar 30, 2003*; 4:05 pm, CBS	(7 S)	vs. (1 S) No. 5 Texas; Elite Eight	L 76–85	22–13	Alamodome (30,169); San Antonio, Texas
*Non-conference game. ^{#}Rankings from AP Poll. (#) Tournament seedings in parentheses. All times are in Local Source.

== Rankings ==
Ranking movement Legend: ██ Increase in ranking. ██ Decrease in ranking. (RV) Received votes but unranked. (NR) Not ranked.
Poll	Pre	Wk 2	Wk 3	Wk 4	Wk 5	Wk 6	Wk 7	Wk 8	Wk 9	Wk 10	Wk 11	Wk 12	Wk 13	Wk 14	Wk 15	Wk 16	Wk 17	Wk 18	Wk 19	Final
AP	9	9	9	21	21	15	15	14	25	NR	NR	NR	NR	NR	NR	NR	NR	NR	NR	N/A*
Coaches	10	10	10	21	21	15	15	14	20	NR	NR	NR	NR	NR	NR	NR	NR	NR	NR	18

*AP does not release post-NCAA tournament rankings

== Awards and honors ==
- Chris Hill – All Big Ten Second Team
- Alan Anderson – All Big Ten Honorable Mention (Media)
