= 2002–03 Illinois Fighting Illini men's basketball team =

American college basketball season

2002–03 Illinois Fighting Illini men's basketball

Big Ten tournament champions

NCAA tournament, second round
- Conference: Big Ten Conference

Ranking
- Coaches: No. 13
- AP: No. 11
- Record: 25–7 (11–5 Big Ten)
- Head coach: Bill Self (3rd season)
- Assistant coaches: Tim Jankovich (1st season); Wayne McClain (2nd season); Norm Roberts (3rd season)
- MVP: Brian Cook
- Captains: Brian Cook; Sean Harrington; Jerrance Howard
- Home arena: Assembly Hall

2002–03 Big Ten Conference men's basketball standings
	Conf.				Overall
Team	W		L	PCT	W		L	PCT
No. 21 Wisconsin	12	–	4	.750	24	–	8	.750
No. 11 Illinois †	11	–	5	.688	25	–	7	.781
Purdue	10	–	6	.625	19	–	11	.633
Michigan State	10	–	6	.625	22	–	13	.629
Michigan	10	–	6	.625	18	–	12	.600
Indiana	8	–	8	.500	21	–	13	.618
Minnesota	8	–	8	.500	19	–	14	.576
Iowa	7	–	9	.438	17	–	14	.548
Ohio State	7	–	9	.438	17	–	15	.531
Northwestern	3	–	13	.188	12	–	17	.414
Penn State	2	–	14	.125	7	–	21	.250
† 2003 Big Ten tournament winner Rankings from AP poll

The 2002–03 Illinois Fighting Illini men's basketball team represented University of Illinois at Urbana-Champaign in the 2002-03 NCAA Division I men's basketball season. This was head coach Bill Self's third (and final) season at Illinois.

== Season ==
The 2003 squad started three freshmen, a sophomore and one senior, and still finished with a 25–7 record and second-place finish in the Big Ten. Brian Cook earned Big Ten Player of the Year honors and the Illini won the Big Ten tournament championship for the first time.

== Roster ==
2002–03 Illinois Fighting Illini men's basketball team
Players
Coaches

Pos.	#	Name	Height	Weight	Year	Previous school	Hometown
F/C	1	Aaron Spears	6 ft 9 in (2.06 m)	250 lb (113 kg)	Fr	Dunbar High School	Chicago, IL
G	4	Luther Head	6 ft 3 in (1.91 m)	175 lb (79 kg)	So	Manley High School	Chicago, IL
G	5	Deron Williams	6 ft 3 in (1.91 m)	210 lb (95 kg)	Fr	The Colony High School	The Colony, TX
G	11	Dee Brown	6 ft 0 in (1.83 m)	175 lb (79 kg)	Fr	Proviso East High School	Maywood, IL
F	23	Blandon Ferguson	6 ft 3 in (1.91 m)	205 lb (93 kg)	Sr	St. Joseph Notre Dame High School	Oakland, CA
G	24	Sean Harrington (C)	6 ft 3 in (1.91 m)	185 lb (84 kg)	Sr	Elgin High School	Bartlett, IL
G	25	Jerrance Howard (C)	6 ft 1 in (1.85 m)	200 lb (91 kg)	RS Jr	Peoria High School	Peoria, IL
G	31	Nick Huge	6 ft 4 in (1.93 m)	215 lb (98 kg)	RS Jr	Christian High School/Appalachian State University	Charlotte, NC
F	32	Kyle Wilson	6 ft 8 in (2.03 m)	230 lb (104 kg)	Fr	Dallas Jesuit High School	Plano, TX
F	34	Brian Cook (C)	6 ft 10 in (2.08 m)	240 lb (109 kg)	Sr	Lincoln Community High School	Lincoln, IL
F	40	James Augustine	6 ft 10 in (2.08 m)	220 lb (100 kg)	Fr	Lincoln-Way Central High School	Mokena, IL
F	42	Clayton Thomas (W)	6 ft 7 in (2.01 m)	240 lb (109 kg)	Sr	Larkin High School	Elgin, IL
F	43	Roger Powell	6 ft 6 in (1.98 m)	220 lb (100 kg)	So	Joliet Central High School	Joliet, IL
C	45	Nick Smith	7 ft 2 in (2.18 m)	240 lb (109 kg)	RS So	Bloomingdale High School	Valrico, FL
F/C	50	Jack Ingram (redshirt)	6 ft 10 in (2.08 m)	230 lb (104 kg)	Jr	Marshall High School/University of Tulsa	San Antonio, TX

Head coach

- Bill Self (Oklahoma State)

Assistant coach(es)

- Tim Jankovich (Kansas State)
- Wayne McClain (Illinois State)
- Jay Price (Kansas)
- Norm Roberts (Queens College)

Legend

- (C) Team captain
- (S) Suspended
- (I) Ineligible
- (W) Walk-on
- Injured
- Current redshirt

Roster

== Schedule ==
Date time, TV	Rank^{#}	Opponent^{#}	Result	Record	Site (attendance) city, state
Exhibition
Nov 12, 2002*; 7:00 pm		Spotlight Jammers	W 91-41		Assembly Hall; Champaign, IL
Nov 15, 2002*; 7:00 pm		EA Sports All-Stars	W 79-76		Assembly Hall; Champaign, IL
Non-Conference regular season
11/24/2002*		Lehigh	W 90–56	1–0	Assembly Hall (11,758); Champaign, IL
11/27/2002*		Arkansas–Pine Bluff	W 96–43	2–0	Assembly Hall (11,733); Champaign, IL
12/1/2002*		Western Illinois	W 85–56	3–0	Assembly Hall (14,224); Champaign, IL
12/7/2002*	No. 25	No. 12 North Carolina; Big Ten-ACC Challenge	W 92–65	4–0	Assembly Hall (16,500); Champaign, IL
12/7/2002*	No. 25	vs. Arkansas	W 62–58	5–0	Alltel Arena (9,756); North Little Rock, AR
12/10/2002*	No. 15	Eastern Illinois	W 80–68	6–0	Assembly Hall (13,828); Champaign, IL
12/14/2002*	No. 15	vs. Temple	W 70–54	7–0	United Center (13,361); Chicago, IL
12/21/2002*	No. 12	vs. No. 11 Missouri; Braggin' Rights	W 85–70	8–0	Scottrade Center (22,153); St. Louis, MO
12/28/2002*	No. 7	at Memphis	L 74–77	8–1	The Pyramid (19,837); Memphis, TN
12/28/2002*	No. 11	Coppin State	W 63–37	9–1	Assembly Hall (13,923); Champaign, IL
1/4/2002*	No. 5	Oakland	W 88–53	10–1	Assembly Hall (14,837); Champaign, IL
Big Ten regular season
1/7/2003	No. 10	at Minnesota	W 76–70	11–1 (1–0)	Williams Arena (13,548); Minneapolis, MN
1/11/2003	No. 10	Wisconsin	W 69–63	12–1 (2–0)	Assembly Hall (16,500); Champaign, IL
1/15/2003	No. 8	at Iowa; Rivalry	L 61–68	12–2 (2–1)	Carver–Hawkeye Arena (15,232); Iowa City, IA
1/18/2003; CBS	No. 8	at No. 18 Indiana; Rivalry	L 66–74	12–3 (2–2)	Assembly Hall (17,456); Bloomington, IN
1/22/2003	No. 18	Purdue	W 75–62	13–3 (3–2)	Assembly Hall (16,500); Champaign, IL
1/25/2003	No. 18	at Penn State	W 75–63	14–3 (4–2)	Bryce Jordan Center (9,601); University Park, PA
1/29/2003	No. 13	Michigan	W 67–60	15–3 (5–2)	Assembly Hall (16,500); Champaign, IL
2/2/2003; CBS	No. 13	at Michigan State	L 65–68	15–4 (5–3)	Breslin Student Events Center (14,759); East Lansing, MI
2/9/2003; CBS	No. 16	Ohio State	W 76–57	16–4 (6–3)	Assembly Hall (16,500); Champaign, IL
2/15/2003	No. 14	at Purdue	L 61–70	16–5 (6–4)	Mackey Arena (14,123); West Lafayette, IN
2/18/2003	No. 20	Michigan State	W 70–40	17–5 (7–4)	Assembly Hall (16,500); Champaign, IL
2/22/2003; CBS	No. 20	vs. Northwestern; Rivalry	W 73–61	18–5 (8–4)	United Center (15,429); Chicago, IL
2/25/2003	No. 18	Indiana; Rivalry	W 80–54	19–5 (9–4)	Assembly Hall (16,500); Champaign, IL
3/1/2003	No. 18	at Michigan	W 82–79	20–5 (10–4)	Crisler Arena (13,057); Ann Arbor, MI
3/5/2003	No. 14	at No. 24 Wisconsin	L 59–60	20–6 (10–5)	Kohl Center (17,142); Madison, WI
3/9/2003; CBS	No. 14	Minnesota	W 84–60	21–6 (11–5)	Assembly Hall (16,500); Champaign, IL
Big Ten tournament
3/14/2003	(2) No. 13	vs. (10) Northwestern; Quarterfinals / Rivalry	W 94–65	22–6	United Center (18,895); Chicago, IL
3/15/2003; CBS	(2) No. 13	vs. (6) Indiana; Semifinals	W 73–72	23–6	United Center (20,248); Chicago, IL
3/16/2003; CBS	(2) No. 13	vs. (8) Ohio State; Big Ten tournament Championship	W 72–59	24–6	United Center (17,007); Chicago, IL
NCAA tournament
3/20/2003; 12:10 pm, CBS	(4 W) No. 11	vs. (13 W) Western Kentucky; First Round	W 65–60	25–6	RCA Dome (21,250); Indianapolis, IN
3/22/2003; 6:10 pm, CBS	(4 W) No. 11	vs. (5 W) No. 22 Notre Dame; Second Round	L 60–68	25–7	RCA Dome (25,767); Indianapolis, IN
*Non-conference game. ^{#}Rankings from AP Poll. (#) Tournament seedings in parentheses. All times are in Central Time.

== Season Statistics ==
Legend
GP	Games played	GS	Games started	Avg	Average per game
FG	Field-goals made	FGA	Field-goal attempts	Off	Offensive rebounds
Def	Defensive rebounds	A	Assists	TO	Turnovers
Blk	Blocks	Stl	Steals	High	Team high

Final Individual Statistics
			Minutes		Scoring		Total FGs			3-point FGs			Free-Throws			Rebounds							
Player	GP	GS	Tot	Avg	Pts	Avg	FG	FGA	Pct	3FG	3FA	Pct	FT	FTA	Pct	Off	Def	Tot	Avg	A	TO	Blk	Stl
Cook, Brian	30	30	940	31.3	599	20.0	202	422	.479	27	89	.303	168	205	.820	44	183	227	7.6	60	83	13	20
Brown, Dee	32	31	1090	34.1	384	12.0	142	327	.434	51	155	.329	49	72	.681	35	84	119	3.7	159	62	0	57
Powell, Roger	30	19	558	18.6	261	8.7	104	176	.591	20	49	.408	33	57	.579	40	61	101	3.4	12	24	12	9
Harrington, Sean	32	6	718	22.4	235	7.3	76	171	.444	64	144	.444	19	30	.633	2	71	73	2.3	65	25	0	29
Augustine, James	32	29	697	21.8	225	7.0	94	162	.580	5	14	.357	32	45	.711	64	122	186	5.8	25	45	27	20
Williams, Deron	32	30	868	27.1	202	6.3	75	176	.426	28	79	.354	24	45	.533	15	80	95	3.0	145	59	5	46
Head, Luther	25	8	509	20.4	198	7.9	68	131	.519	28	66	.424	34	46	.739	23	48	71	2.8	42	40	3	27
Smith, Nick	31	5	539	17.4	163	5.3	60	121	.496	5	11	.455	38	44	.864	23	69	92	3.0	26	42	38	11
Wilson, Kyle	18	0	118	6.6	46	2.6	14	37	.378	4	16	.250	14	18	.778	13	16	29	1.6	8	5	1	4
Ferguson, Blandon	24	1	218	9.1	40	1.7	11	33	.333	0	3	.000	18	26	.692	11	21	32	1.3	20	20	0	3
Spears, Aaron	6	0	55	9.2	19	3.2	8	12	.667	0	0	.000	3	7	.429	4	5	9	1.5	6	5	1	1
Howard, Jerrance	14	1	52	3.7	9	0.6	4	16	.250	1	6	.167	0	0	.000	0	3	3	0.2	7	2	0	0
Huge, Nick	8	0	17	2.1	4	0.5	0	3	.000	0	3	.000	4	4	1.000	0	1	1	0.1	0	1	0	0
Thomas, Clayton	9	0	21	2.3	3	0.3	1	6	.167	0	1	.000	1	4	.250	1	3	4	0.4	0	2	0	0
Team																42	49	91			3		
Total	32		6400		2388	74.6	859	1793	.479	233	636	.366	437	603	.725	317	816	1133	35.4	575	418	100	227
Opponents	32		6400		1970	61.6	657	1741	.377	192	655	.293	464	655	.708	356	686	1042	32.6	353	469	84	182

== NCAA basketball tournament ==
- West regional
  - Illinois 65, Western Kentucky 60
  - Notre Dame 68, Illinois 60

== Awards and honors ==
- Brian Cook
  - Big Ten tournament Most Outstanding Player
  - Big Ten Player of the Year
  - Chicago Tribune Silver Basketball award
  - Team Most Valuable Player
  - Fighting Illini All-Century team (2005)
  - Sporting News 2nd team All-American
  - Associated Press 3rd team All-American
  - National Association of Basketball Coaches 3rd team All-American
  - Basketball Times 3rd team All-American

== Team players drafted into the NBA ==
Player	NBA Club	Round	Pick
Brian Cook	Los Angeles Lakers	1	24
