= 2002 Maui Invitational =

Hawaiian college basketball tournament

2002 Maui Invitational Tournament
- Season: 2002–03
- Teams: 8
- Finals site: Lahaina Civic Center, Maui, Hawaii
- Champions: Indiana (1st title)
- Runner-up: Virginia (2nd title game)
- Semifinalists: Kentucky; Gonzaga
- Winning coach: Mike Davis (1st title)
- MVP: Bracey Wright (Indiana)

The 2002 Maui Invitational Tournament was an early-season college basketball tournament that was played, for the 19th time, from November 25 to November 27, 2002. The tournament, which began in 1984, was part of the 2002–03 NCAA Division I men's basketball season. The tournament was played at the Lahaina Civic Center in Maui, Hawaii and was won by the Indiana Hoosiers. It was the first title for both the program and for its head coach Mike Davis.

== Bracket ==
Fifth Place Game; November 27
Arizona State	83
Utah	79
Seventh Place Game
Chaminade	55
UMass	69

Consolation 2nd Round; November 26
Chaminade	72
Arizona State	101
UMass	53
Utah	69

First round November 25
Chaminade	72
Virginia	86
17	Kentucky	82
Arizona State	65
22	Indiana	84
UMass	71
21	Gonzaga	71
Utah	52

Semifinals; November 26
Virginia	75
17	Kentucky	61
19	Indiana	76
20	Gonzaga	75

Championship; November 27
Virginia	63
19	Indiana	70
Third-place game
15	Kentucky	80
20	Gonzaga	72
