= Brian Cook (basketball) =

American basketball player (born 1980)

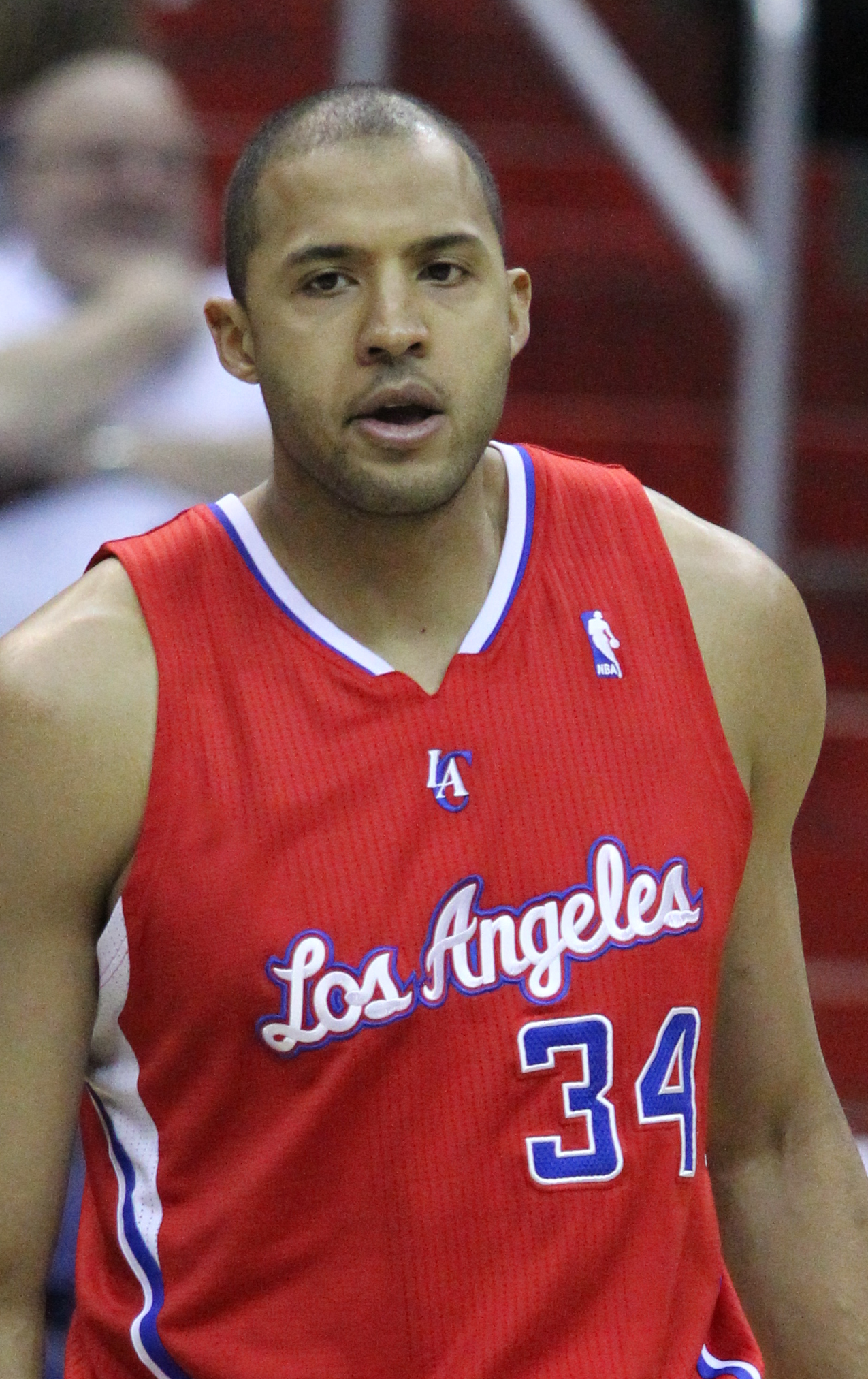
- Cook with the Los Angeles Clippers in 2011

Personal information
- Born: December 4, 1980 (age 45) Lincoln, Illinois, U.S.
- Listed height: 6 ft 9 in (2.06 m)
- Listed weight: 250 lb (113 kg)

Career information
- High school: Lincoln (Lincoln, Illinois)
- College: Illinois (1999–2003)
- NBA draft: 2003: 1st round, 24th overall pick
- Drafted by: Los Angeles Lakers
- Playing career: 2003–2015
- Position: Power forward / center
- Number: 7, 43, 34

Career history
- 2003–2007: Los Angeles Lakers
- 2007–2009: Orlando Magic
- 2009–2010: Houston Rockets
- 2010–2012: Los Angeles Clippers
- 2012: Washington Wizards
- 2013: Piratas de Quebradillas
- 2014: Sporting Al Riyadi Beirut
- 2015: Atlético Aguada
- 2015: Chiba Jets

Career highlights
- BSN champion (2013); Second-team All-American – SN (2003); Third-team All-American – AP, NABC (2003); Big Ten Player of the Year (2003); Big Ten men's basketball tournament MOP (2003); Big Ten Freshman of the Year (2000); McDonald's All-American (1999); Illinois Mr. Basketball (1999); Second-team Parade All-American (1999)

Career NBA statistics
- Points: 2,312 (5.5 ppg)
- Rebounds: 1,115 (2.6 rpg)
- Assists: 252 (0.6 apg)
- Stats at NBA.com
- Stats at Basketball Reference
Medals
Men's basketball
Representing United States
FIBA U21 World Championship
| Gold medal – first place | 2001 Saitama | Team competition |

Brian Joshua Cook (born December 4, 1980) is an American former professional basketball player. He was drafted out of the University of Illinois with the 24th overall pick in the 2003 NBA draft by the Los Angeles Lakers.

In 2004, Cook was named to the University of Illinois All-Century Team.

== High school career ==
Cook played high school basketball at Lincoln Community High School in central Illinois where he led the Railsplitters to the quarterfinals of the 1999 Illinois High School Association class AA state boys basketball tournament. Cook scored 38 points in 2 IHSA tournament finals games, averaging 19.0 points per game. He was named to the 1998 State Farm Holiday Classic all-tournament team and was a 1999 McDonald's All-American. He was also named the 1999 Illinois Mr. Basketball after averaging 21.7 points, 10.1 rebounds, 3.2 blocks, 2.0 steals and 1.8 assists per game as a senior. Cook was inducted into the Illinois Basketball Coaches Association Hall of Fame in 2016.

== College career ==
Cook played 132 games in four years for the University of Illinois, most of them under coach Bill Self, and led the Illini in rebounding in each season. Cook was a versatile scorer from both inside and outside the paint, utilizing his height to score in the post and hitting three-point shots when left open. This helped him to earn co-Big Ten Freshman of the Year honors during his freshman year at Illinois.

Cook helped lead the Illini to a number one seed in the 2001 NCAA Tournament, and the Illini cruised to the Elite 8, where they were upset in a hard-fought and controversial game by Cook's future teammate Luke Walton and the Arizona Wildcats.

As a senior in the 2002–03 season, Cook led the Fighting Illini in scoring with 20.0 points per game, and received the Chicago Tribune Silver Basketball as the Most Outstanding Player of the Big Ten Conference. That same season, Cook was named second team All-American by The Sporting News, and third team All-American by the Associated Press, the National Association of Basketball Coaches, and The Basketball Times, as well as Big Ten Player of the Year and first team All-Big Ten by both the coaches and the media. Additionally, he would lead the Illini to the Big Ten men's basketball tournament championship and be named Most Outstanding Player. Cook left Illinois as the school's third all-time leading scorer with 1,748 total points, at an average of 13.2 points per game, behind Deon Thomas and Kiwane Garris.

== Professional career ==
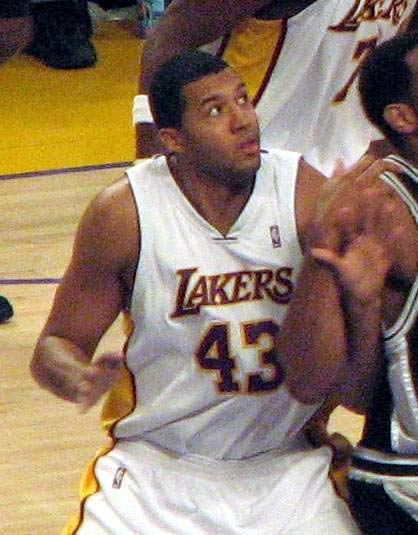
Cook with the Los Angeles Lakers

Cook was selected with the 24th overall pick in the 2003 NBA draft by the Los Angeles Lakers. He played sparingly in his rookie campaign as a backup to superstar center Shaquille O'Neal, and was mostly an interior player, notching only five three-point attempts out of 141 total field goal attempts. As his professional career evolved, however, Cook once again became a player who could play beyond the perimeter, after O'Neal moved on to the Miami Heat and Rudy Tomjanovich took over for Phil Jackson as Lakers' head coach. He was mainly used as a three-point specialist; 199 of 422 (or 47.2%) of Cook's field goal attempts were from behind the three-point arc. When Phil Jackson returned to coach the Lakers in 2005–06, Cook started to take less three-pointers again, which resulted in Cook improving his overall field-goal percentage from .417 in 2004–05 to .520 in 2005–06. It also resulted in an improvement in his three-point field-goal percentage, from .392 in 2004–05 to .441 in 2005–06. His improved play kept Cook on the court more as his minutes played per game rose from 15.1 in 2004–05 to 19.4 in 2005–06.

On November 20, 2007, Cook was traded, along with Maurice Evans, to the Orlando Magic in exchange for Trevor Ariza.

On February 19, 2009, Cook was traded to the Houston Rockets in a three-team trade also involving the Magic and the Memphis Grizzlies. On February 20, 2010, he was waived by the Rockets.

On July 9, 2010, Cook signed with the Los Angeles Clippers.

On March 15, 2012, Cook was traded, along with a 2015 second-round pick, to the Washington Wizards in exchange for Nick Young.

Cook's final NBA game ever was during his time with the Wizards, as he played his final game on April 26, 2012, in a 104–70 win over the Miami Heat. He recorded 4 points and 1 rebound in his final game. On September 17, 2012, he re-signed with the Wizards. However, he was later waived by the Wizards on October 28, 2012.

In March 2013, Cook signed with Piratas de Quebradillas for the 2013 BSN season.

On September 30, 2013, Cook signed with the Utah Jazz. However, he was later waived by the Jazz on October 26, 2013.

On September 25, 2014, Cook signed with the Detroit Pistons. However, he was later waived by the Pistons on October 20, 2014. On December 28, 2014, he signed with Al-Riyadi of the Lebanese Basketball League. He left Al-Riyadi in mid-January after appearing in just three games. On February 10, 2015, he signed with Aguada of the Liga Uruguaya de Basketball, in Montevideo, Uruguay. He also managed just three games for Aguada.

On June 15, 2015, Cook signed with Chiba Jets of the Japanese National Basketball League.

== Personal life ==
Cook is the son of Norman and Joyce Cook, and has two younger sisters, Kristina and Natasha. His father was an All-American with the University of Kansas and played briefly for the Boston Celtics. His uncle, Joe Cook, played basketball for Duke University from 1988 to 1990.

On July 4, 2009, Cook married long-time girlfriend, Victoria Velasquez.

Cook has played in the BIG3 basketball league as a member of the Killer 3's team.

== Honors ==
=== High school ===
- 1998 – State Farm Holiday Classic All-Tournament Team
- 1999 – McDonald's All-American
- 2016 – Inducted into the Illinois Basketball Coaches Association's Hall of Fame as a player.

=== College ===
- 2000 – Co-Big Ten Freshman of the Year
- 2000 – Big Ten tournament All-Tournament Team
- 2001 – 2nd Team All-Big Ten
- 2002 – 2nd Team All-Big Ten
- 2003 – Team Co-Captain
- 2003 – Team MVP
- 2003 – Preseason Wooden Award Nominee
- 2003 – 1st Team All-Big Ten
- 2003 – Big Ten Conference Men's Basketball Player of the Year
- 2003 – Chicago Tribune's Silver Basketball award
- 2003 – Big Ten tournament All-Tournament Team
- 2003 – Big Ten tournament Most Outstanding Player
- 2003 – 3rd Team All American
- 2004 – Elected to the "Illini Men's Basketball All-Century Team".
- 2008 – Honored jersey which hangs in the State Farm Center to show regard for being the most decorated basketball players in the University of Illinois' history.

== College statistics ==
| Season | Games | Points | PPG | Field Goals | Attempts | Avg | Free Throws | Attempts | Avg | Rebounds | Avg | Assists | APG | Blocks | BPG |
|---|---|---|---|---|---|---|---|---|---|---|---|---|---|---|---|
| 1999–2000 | 32 | 287 | 9.6 | 112 | 213 | .526 | 51 | 83 | .614 | 143 | 4.5 | 24 | 0.8 | 28 | 0.9 |
| 2000–01 | 35 | 391 | 11.2 | 147 | 269 | .546 | 69 | 86 | .802 | 212 | 6.1 | 43 | 1.2 | 45 | 1.3 |
| 2001–02 | 35 | 471 | 13.5 | 174 | 342 | .509 | 96 | 110 | .873* | 233 | 6.7 | 44 | 1.3 | 50 | 1.4 |
| 2002–03 | 30 | 599 | 20.0 | 202 | 422 | .479 | 168 | 205 | .820 | 227 | 7.6 | 60 | 2.0 | 13 | 0.4 |
| Totals | 132 | 1748 | 13.2 | 635 | 1246 | .510 | 384 | 484 | .793 | 815 | 6.2 | 171 | 1.3 | 136 | 1.0 |

* All-time leader in University of Illinois history

== NBA career statistics ==
Legend
| GP | Games played | GS | Games started | MPG | Minutes per game |
| FG% | Field goal percentage | 3P% | 3-point field goal percentage | FT% | Free throw percentage |
| RPG | Rebounds per game | APG | Assists per game | SPG | Steals per game |
| BPG | Blocks per game | PPG | Points per game | **Bold** | Career high |

=== Regular season ===
| Year | Team | GP | GS | MPG | FG% | 3P% | FT% | RPG | APG | SPG | BPG | PPG |
|---|---|---|---|---|---|---|---|---|---|---|---|---|
| 2003–04 | L.A. Lakers | 35 | 2 | 12.6 | .475 | .000 | .750 | 2.9 | .6 | **.5** | **.5** | 4.4 |
| 2004–05 | L.A. Lakers | 72 | 0 | 15.1 | .417 | .392 | .757 | 3.0 | .5 | .3 | .4 | 6.4 |
| 2005–06 | L.A. Lakers | **81** | **46** | **19.0** | **.511** | .429 | .832 | **3.4** | .9 | **.5** | .4 | **7.9** |
| 2006–07 | L.A. Lakers | 65 | 24 | 15.7 | .453 | .400 | .723 | 3.3 | **1.0** | .4 | .4 | 6.9 |
| 2007–08 | L.A. Lakers | 6 | 2 | 11.7 | .190 | .200 | **1.000** | 1.7 | .5 | .3 | .0 | 2.3 |
| 2007–08 | Orlando | 45 | 0 | 12.4 | .394 | .390 | .882 | 2.2 | .5 | .2 | .3 | 5.0 |
| 2008–09 | Orlando | 21 | 0 | 7.0 | .383 | **.440** | .833 | 1.3 | .2 | .1 | .0 | 3.0 |
| 2008–09 | Houston | 9 | 0 | 2.8 | .313 | .400 | .000 | .6 | .1 | .0 | .3 | 1.3 |
| 2009–10 | Houston | 15 | 0 | 2.9 | .304 | .222 | .714 | .6 | .1 | .0 | .1 | 1.4 |
| 2010–11 | L.A. Clippers | 40 | 0 | 11.2 | .424 | .430 | .625 | 2.4 | .4 | .3 | .3 | 4.8 |
| 2011–12 | L.A. Clippers | 16 | 0 | 7.6 | .224 | .185 | **1.000** | 1.4 | .1 | .1 | .3 | 1.9 |
| 2011–12 | Washington | 16 | 0 | 9.7 | .408 | .217 | .833 | 2.5 | .5 | .3 | .1 | 3.1 |
| Career | | 421 | 74 | 13.4 | .439 | .382 | .783 | 2.6 | .6 | .3 | .3 | 5.5 |

=== Playoffs ===
| Year | Team | GP | GS | MPG | FG% | 3P% | FT% | RPG | APG | SPG | BPG | PPG |
|---|---|---|---|---|---|---|---|---|---|---|---|---|
| 2004 | L.A. Lakers | **13** | 0 | 3.5 | .333 | .000 | **1.000** | .9 | .1 | .1 | .0 | .9 |
| 2006 | L.A. Lakers | 7 | 0 | **11.1** | **.391** | .364 | **1.000** | **3.1** | **1.1** | .1 | .0 | **6.3** |
| 2007 | L.A. Lakers | 5 | 0 | 10.2 | .333 | **.429** | **1.000** | 1.2 | .0 | .0 | **.2** | 3.6 |
| 2009 | Houston | 6 | 0 | 5.3 | .267 | .222 | .000 | 2.0 | .5 | **.3** | **.2** | 1.7 |
| Career | | 31 | 0 | 6.7 | .351 | .333 | 1.000 | 1.7 | .4 | .1 | .1 | 2.7 |

== See also ==
- List of second-generation NBA players

Awards and achievements
| Preceded by Frank Williams | Illinois Mr. Basketball Award Winner; 1999 | Succeeded by Darius Miles |
