= Big Ten Conference Men's Basketball Player of the Year =

Basketball award to best player in Big Ten

- Awarded for: the most outstanding basketball player in the Big Ten Conference
- Country: United States

History
- First award: 1985
- Most recent: Yaxel Lendeborg, Michigan

The Big Ten Conference Men's Basketball Player of the Year is an award given to the Big Ten Conference's most outstanding player. The award was first given following the 1984–85 season. Only four players have won the award multiple times: Jim Jackson of Ohio State (1991, 1992), Mateen Cleaves of Michigan State (1998, 1999), Luka Garza of Iowa (2020, 2021), and Zach Edey of Purdue (2023, 2024). Ten players who won the Big Ten Player of the Year award were also named the national player of the year by one or more major voting bodies: Jim Jackson (1992), Calbert Cheaney of Indiana (1993), Glenn Robinson of Purdue (1994), Evan Turner of Ohio State (2010), Draymond Green of Michigan State (2012), Trey Burke of Michigan (2013), Frank Kaminsky of Wisconsin (2015), Denzel Valentine of Michigan State (2016), Luka Garza of Iowa (2021), and Zach Edey of Purdue (2023 and 2024).

Michigan State has the record for the most winners with nine. Of current Big Ten Conference members, nine schools have never had a winner. Of these, only Northwestern was in the conference since the inception of this award—Penn State joined the Big Ten in 1991, Nebraska joined in 2011, followed by Maryland and Rutgers in 2014, and by Oregon, UCLA, USC, and Washington in 2024. With Braden Smith winning the 2025 award, the Purdue Boilermakers became the first program to have conference players of the year in three consecutive seasons (2023–2025).

== Key ==
†	Co-Players of the Year
*	Awarded a national player of the year award that same season: UPI College Basketball Player of the Year (1954–55 to 1995–96); Oscar Robertson Trophy (1958–59 to present); Naismith College Player of the Year (1968–69 to present); John R. Wooden Award (1976–77 to present)
Player (X)	Denotes the number of times the player has been awarded the Big Ten Player of the Year award at that point

== Winners ==
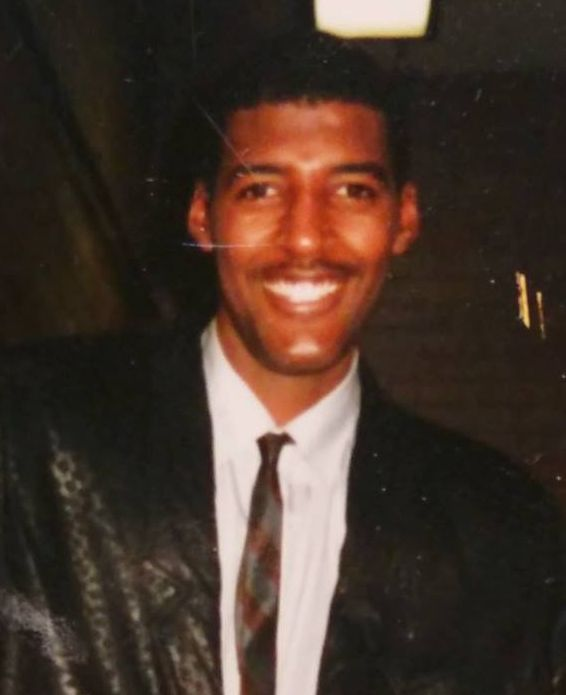
Roy Tarpley, Michigan, 1985

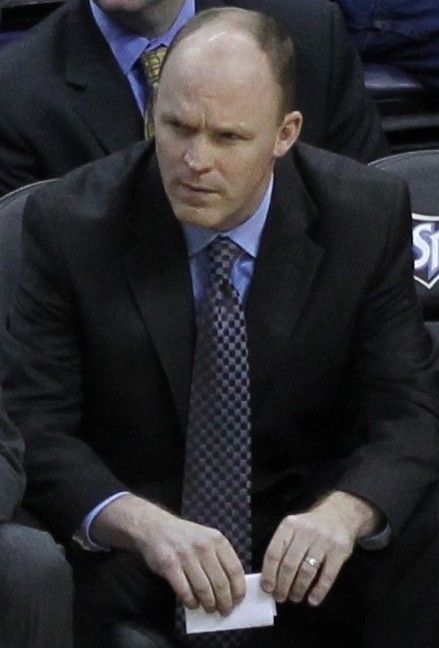
Scott Skiles, Michigan State, 1986

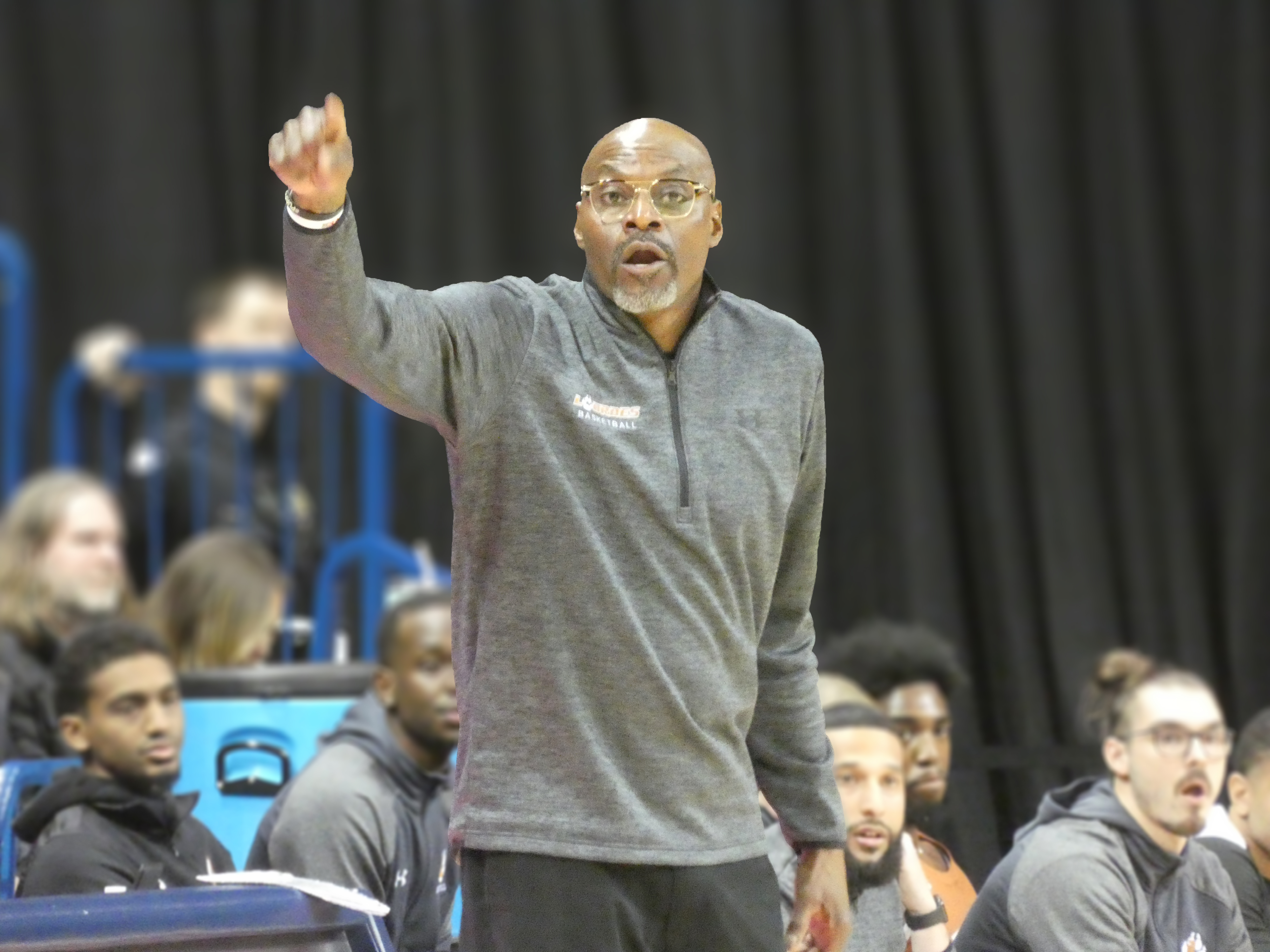
Dennis Hopson, Ohio State, 1987

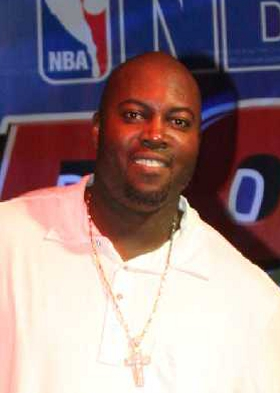
Glen Rice, Michigan, 1989

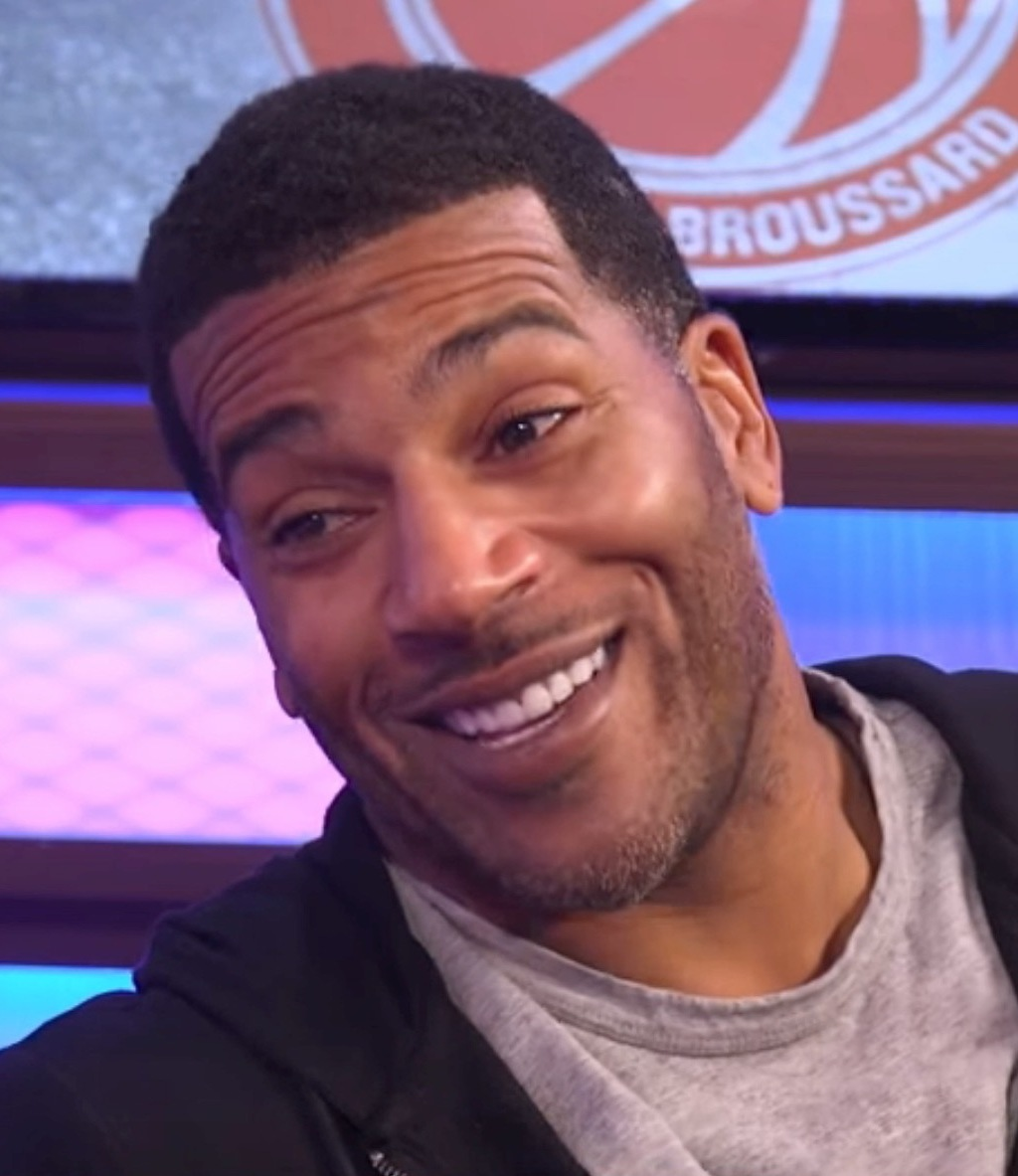
Jim Jackson, Ohio State, 1991 and 1992

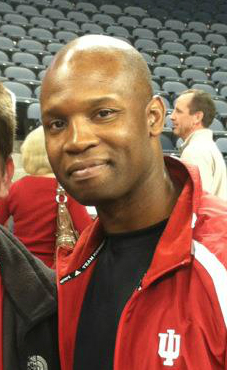
Calbert Cheaney, Indiana, 1993

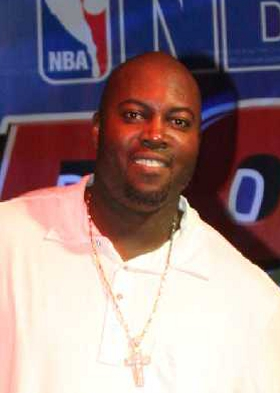
Glen Rice, Michigan, 1989

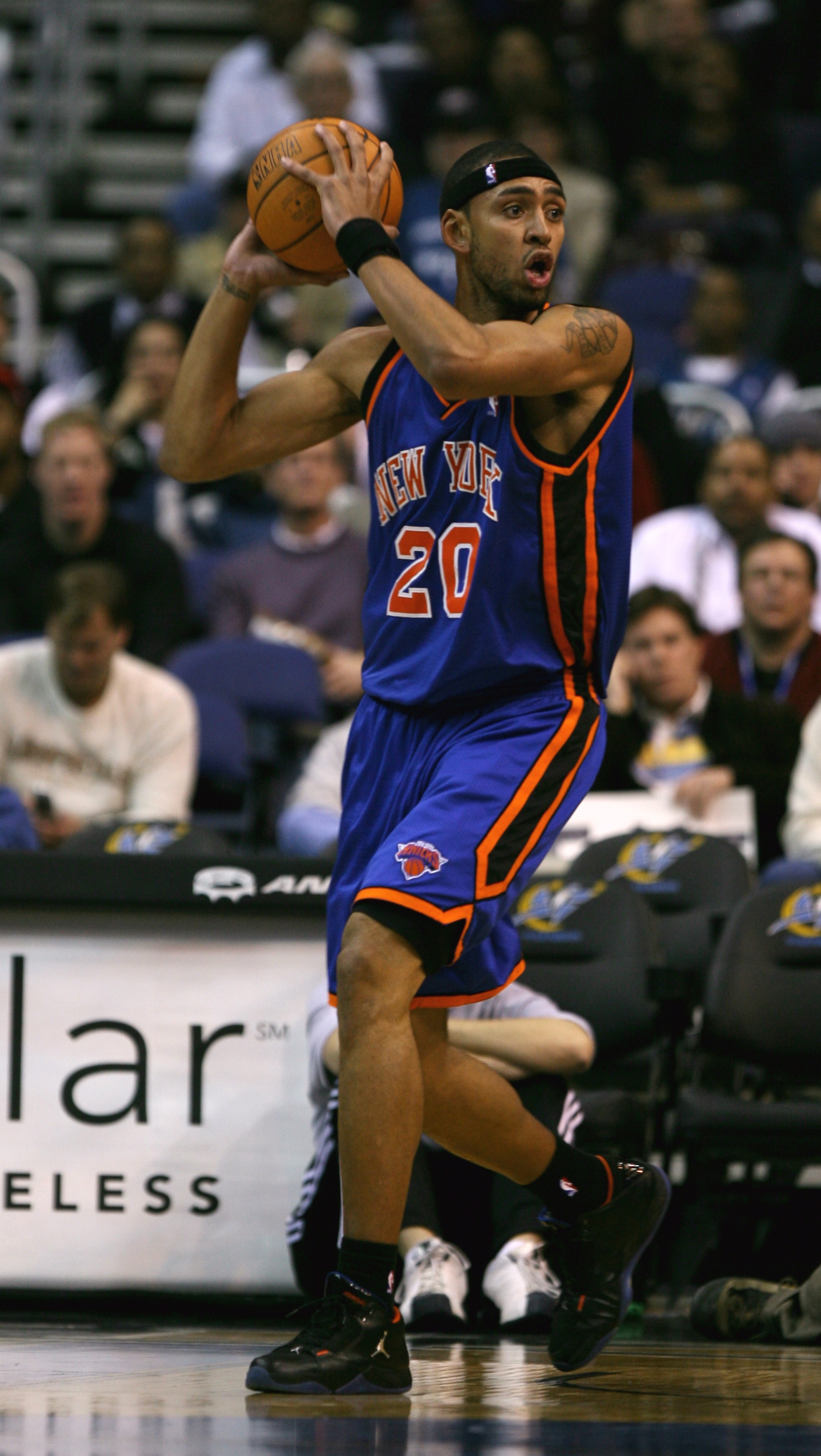
Jared Jeffries, Indiana, 2002

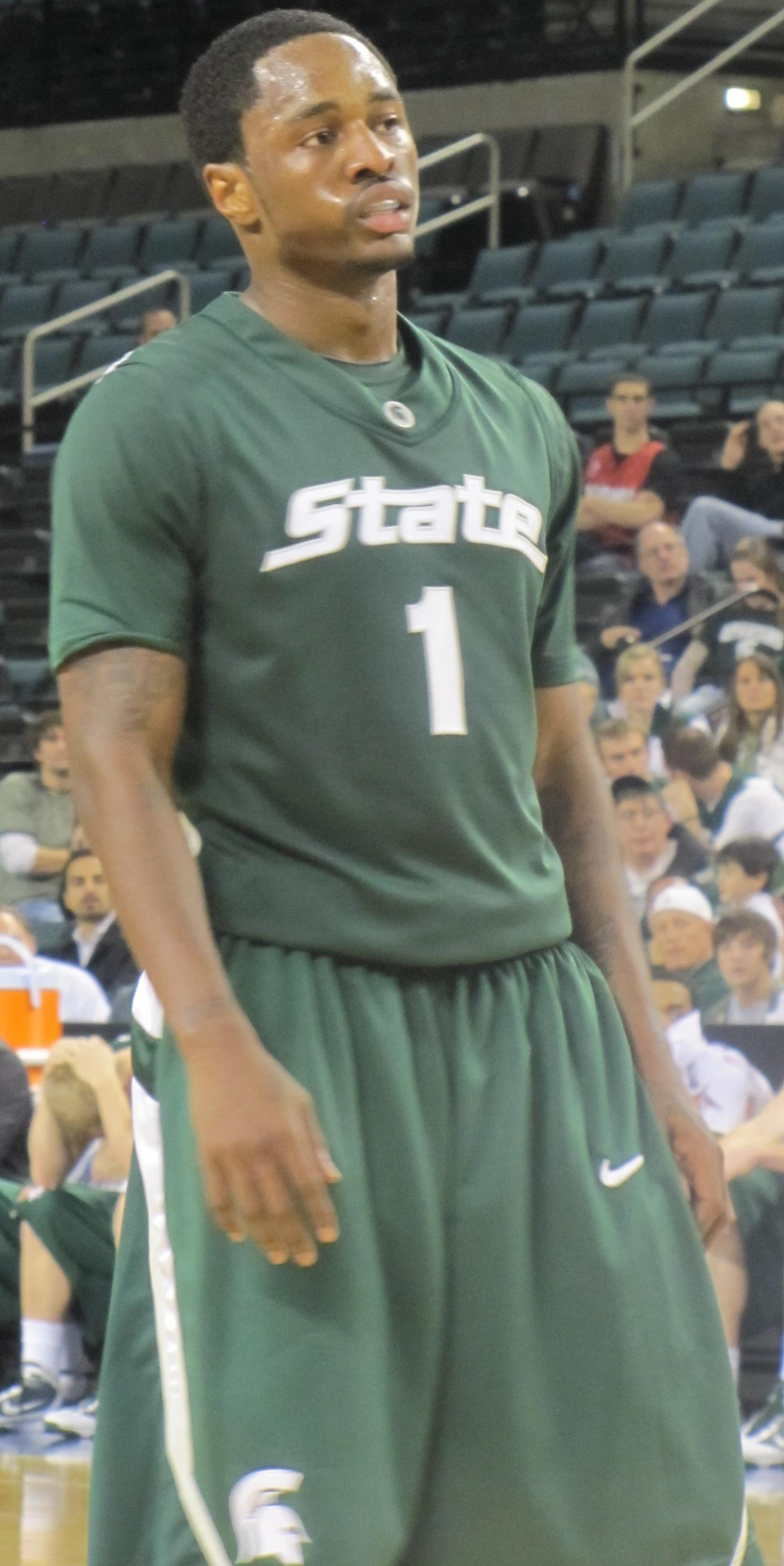
Kalin Lucas, Michigan State, 2009

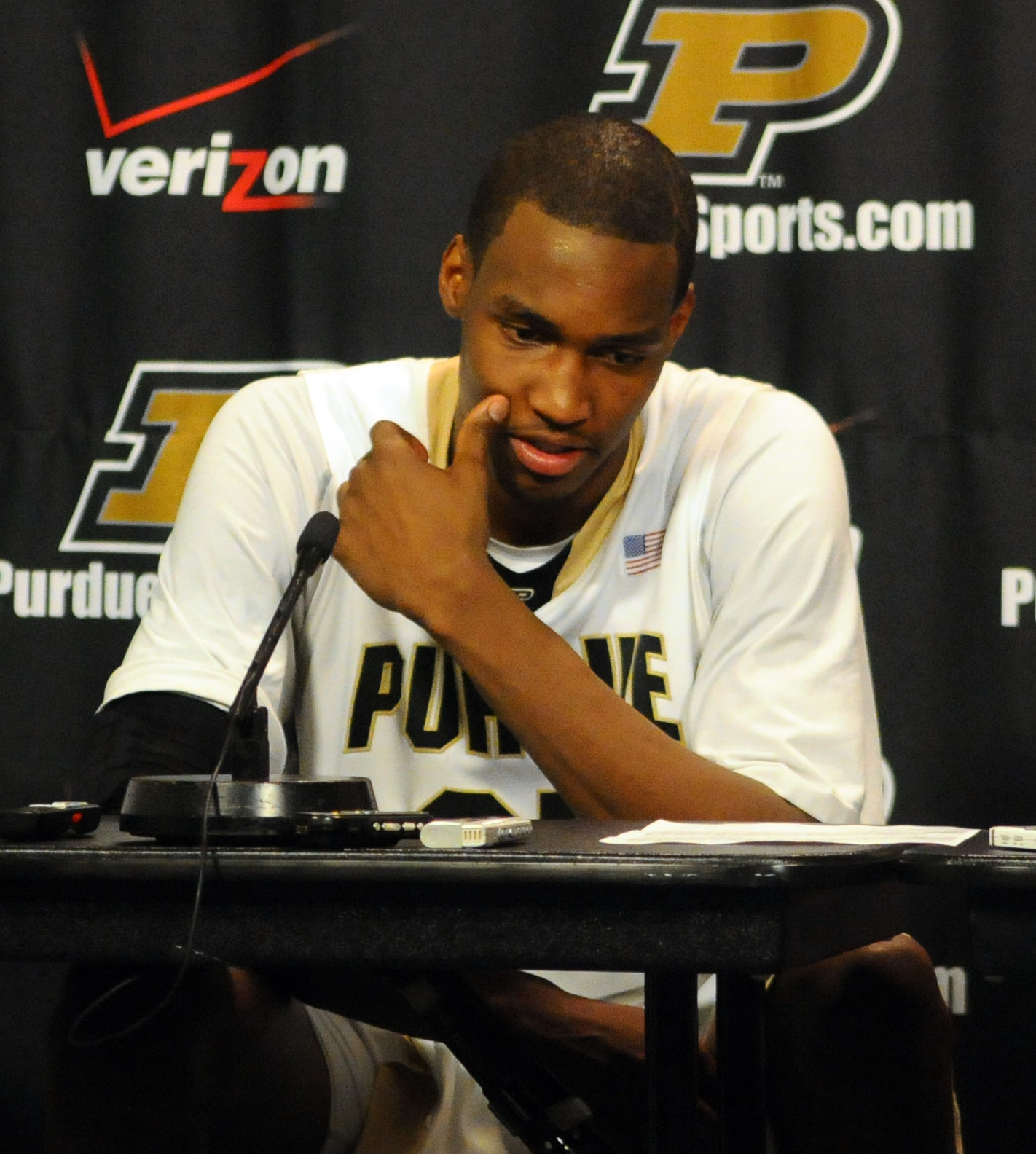
JaJuan Johnson, Purdue, 2011

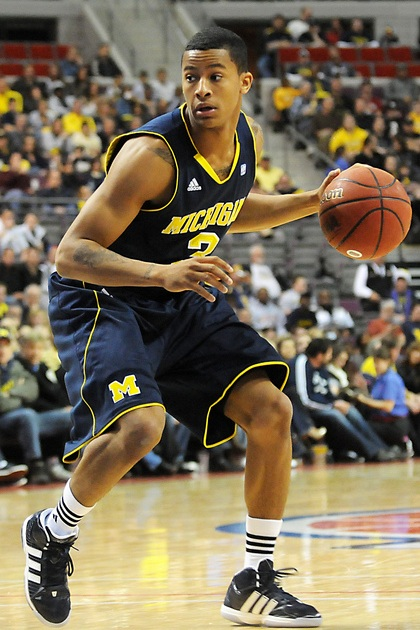
Trey Burke, Michigan, 2013

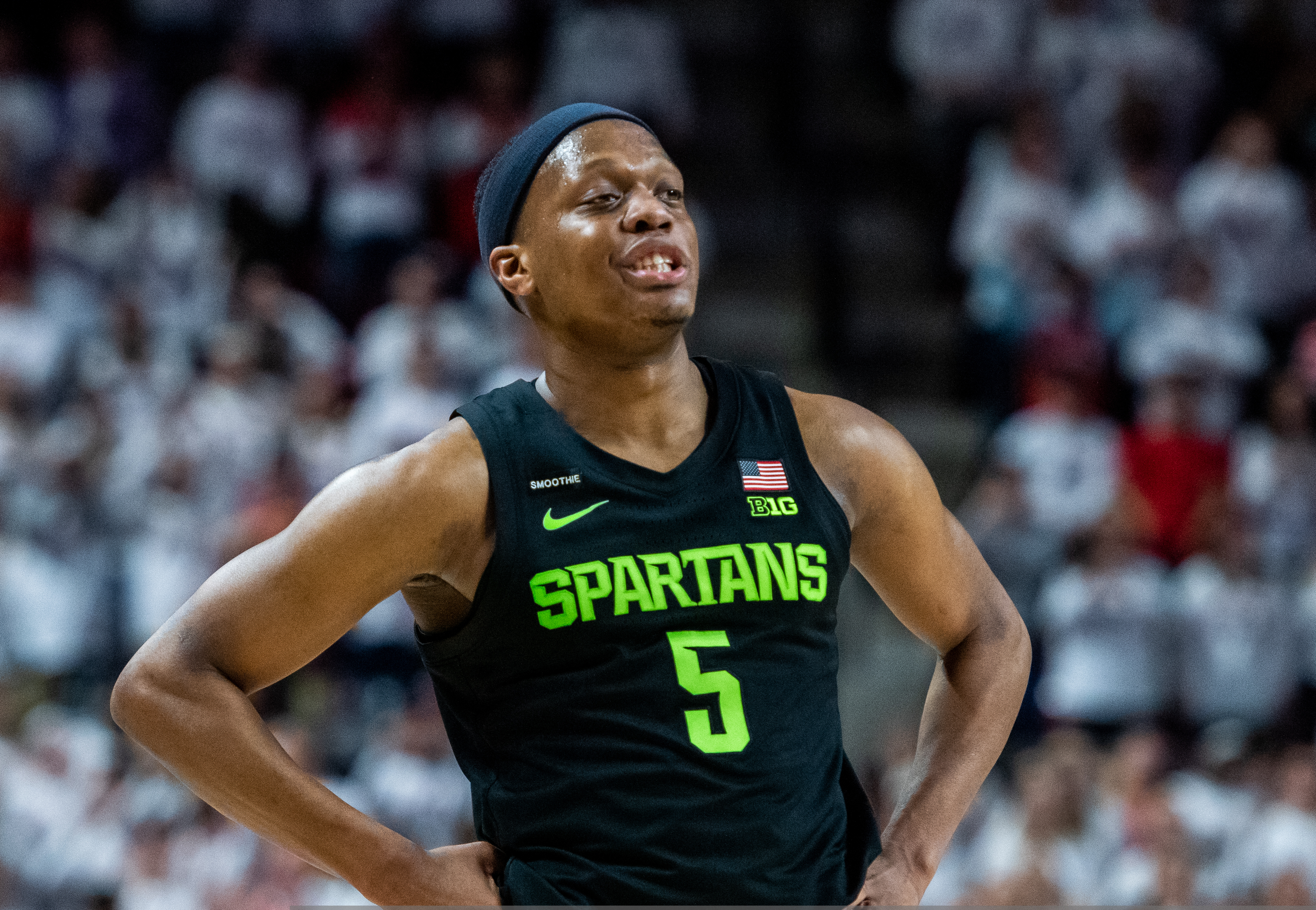
Cassius Winston, Michigan State, 2019

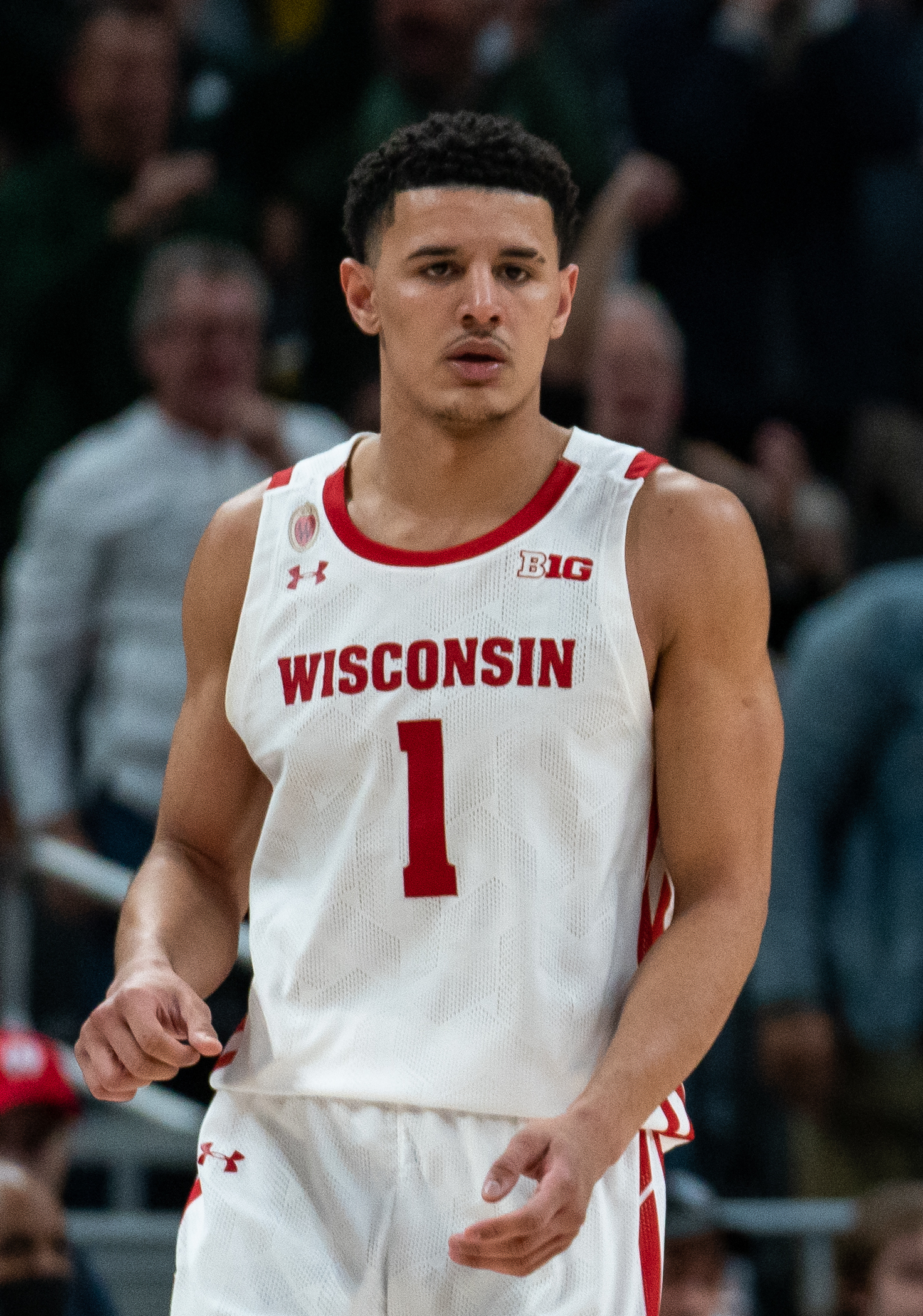
Johnny Davis, Wisconsin, 2022

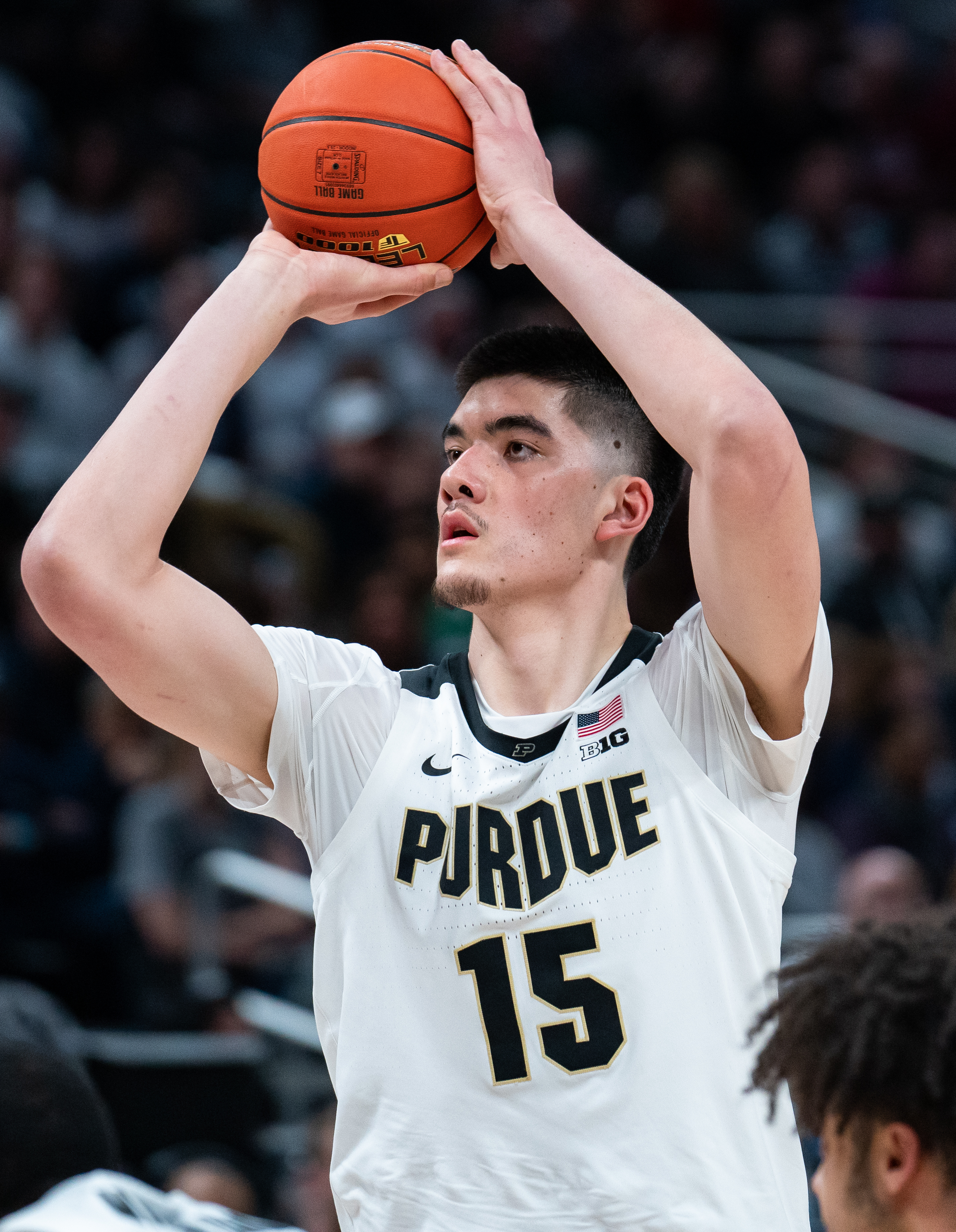
Zach Edey, Purdue, 2023 and 2024

Season	Player	School	Position	Class	Reference
1984–85	Roy Tarpley	Michigan	PF / C	Junior	
1985–86	Scott Skiles	Michigan State	PG	Senior	
1986–87	Dennis Hopson	Ohio State	SF	Senior	
1987–88	Gary Grant	Michigan	PG	Senior	
1988–89^{†}	Jay Edwards	Indiana	SG	Sophomore	
1988–89^{†}	Glen Rice	Michigan	SG / SF	Senior	
1989–90	Steve Scheffler	Purdue	C	Senior	
1990–91	Jim Jackson	Ohio State	SG	Sophomore	
1991–92	Jim Jackson* (2)	Ohio State	SG	Junior	
1992–93	Calbert Cheaney*	Indiana	SF	Senior	
1993–94	Glenn Robinson*	Purdue	SF	Junior	
1994–95	Shawn Respert	Michigan State	SG	Senior	
1995–96	Brian Evans	Indiana	PF	Senior	
1996–97	Bobby Jackson^{[a]}	Minnesota^{[a]}	PG	Senior	
1997–98	Mateen Cleaves	Michigan State	PG	Sophomore	
1998–99^{†}	Mateen Cleaves (2)	Michigan State	PG	Junior	
1998–99^{†}	Scoonie Penn	Ohio State	PG	Junior	
1999–00^{†}	A. J. Guyton	Indiana	SG	Senior	
1999–00^{†}	Morris Peterson	Michigan State	SF	Senior	
2000–01	Frank Williams	Illinois	PG	Sophomore	
2001–02	Jared Jeffries	Indiana	C	Sophomore	
2002–03	Brian Cook	Illinois	PF	Senior	
2003–04	Devin Harris	Wisconsin	PG	Junior	
2004–05	Dee Brown	Illinois	SG	Junior	
2005–06	Terence Dials	Ohio State	PF	Senior	
2006–07	Alando Tucker	Wisconsin	SF	Senior	
2007–08	D. J. White	Indiana	PF	Senior	
2008–09	Kalin Lucas	Michigan State	PG	Sophomore	
2009–10	Evan Turner*	Ohio State	SG	Junior	
2010–11	JaJuan Johnson	Purdue	C	Senior	
2011–12	Draymond Green*	Michigan State	SF	Senior	
2012–13	Trey Burke*	Michigan	PG	Sophomore	
2013–14	Nik Stauskas	Michigan	SG	Sophomore	
2014–15	Frank Kaminsky*	Wisconsin	PF	Senior	
2015–16	Denzel Valentine*	Michigan State	SG	Senior	
2016–17	Caleb Swanigan	Purdue	PF	Sophomore	
2017–18	Keita Bates-Diop	Ohio State	SF	Junior	
2018–19	Cassius Winston	Michigan State	PG	Junior	
2019–20	Luka Garza	Iowa	C	Junior	
2020–21	Luka Garza* (2)	Iowa	C	Senior	
2021–22	Johnny Davis	Wisconsin	SG	Sophomore	
2022–23	Zach Edey*	Purdue	C	Junior	
2023–24	Zach Edey* (2)	Purdue	C	Senior	
2024–25	Braden Smith	Purdue	PG	Junior	
2025–26	Yaxel Lendeborg	Michigan	PF	Graduate	

^{a} Bobby Jackson's selection was later vacated (along with that season's win total and all other accolades) due to an academic fraud scandal that ruled the entire team ineligible.

== Winners by school ==
School (year joined)	Winners	Years
Michigan State (1953)	9	1986, 1995, 1998, 1999^{†}, 2000^{†}, 2009, 2012, 2016, 2019
Ohio State (1912)	7	1987, 1991, 1992, 1999^{†}, 2006, 2010, 2018
Purdue (1896)	7	1990, 1994, 2011, 2017, 2023, 2024, 2025
Indiana (1900)	6	1989^{†}, 1993, 1996, 2000^{†}, 2002, 2008
Michigan (1896)	6	1985, 1988, 1989^{†}, 2013, 2014, 2026
Wisconsin (1896)	4	2004, 2007, 2015, 2022
Illinois (1896)	3	2001, 2003, 2005
Iowa (1900)	2	2020, 2021
Minnesota (1896)	0	~~1997~~^{[a]}
Maryland (2014)	0	—
Nebraska (2011)	0	—
Northwestern (1896)	0	—
Oregon (2024)	0	—
Penn State (1993)	0	—
Rutgers (2014)	0	—
UCLA (2024)	0	—
USC (2024)	0	—
Washington (2024)	0	—
