= 2002–03 Michigan Wolverines men's basketball team =

American college basketball season

2002–03 Michigan Wolverines men's basketball
- Conference: Big Ten Conference
- Record: 18–12 (10–6 Big Ten)
- Head coach: Tommy Amaker (2nd season)
- Assistant coaches: Charles Ramsey; Chuck Swenson; Billy Schmidt
- MVPs: LaVell Blanchard; Daniel Horton
- Captains: Rotolu Adebiyi; LaVell Blanchard; Gavin Groninger

2002–03 Big Ten Conference men's basketball standings
	Conf.				Overall
Team	W		L	PCT	W		L	PCT
No. 21 Wisconsin	12	–	4	.750	24	–	8	.750
No. 11 Illinois †	11	–	5	.688	25	–	7	.781
Purdue	10	–	6	.625	19	–	11	.633
Michigan State	10	–	6	.625	22	–	13	.629
Michigan	10	–	6	.625	18	–	12	.600
Indiana	8	–	8	.500	21	–	13	.618
Minnesota	8	–	8	.500	19	–	14	.576
Iowa	7	–	9	.438	17	–	14	.548
Ohio State	7	–	9	.438	17	–	15	.531
Northwestern	3	–	13	.188	12	–	17	.414
Penn State	2	–	14	.125	7	–	21	.250
† 2003 Big Ten tournament winner Rankings from AP poll

The 2002–03 Michigan Wolverines men's basketball team represented the University of Michigan in intercollegiate college basketball during the 2002–03 season. The team played its home games in the Crisler Arena in Ann Arbor, Michigan, and was a member of the Big Ten Conference. Under the direction of head coach Tommy Amaker, the team finished tied for third in the Big Ten Conference. The team earned a third seed but was defeated in the first round of the 2003 Big Ten Conference men's basketball tournament. The team did not participate in either the 2003 National Invitation Tournament or the 2003 NCAA Men's Division I Basketball Tournament because of the University of Michigan basketball scandal. The team was unranked for all eighteen weeks of Associated Press Top Twenty-Five Poll, and it also ended the season unranked in the final USA Today/CNN Poll. The team had a 1–3 record against ranked opponents, with the lone victory coming against #24 Purdue 78–67 on February 19 at Mackey Arena.

Rotolu Adebiyi, LaVell Blanchard and Gavin Groninger served as team co-captains, and LaVell Blanchard and Daniel Horton shared team MVP honors. The team's leading scorers were LaVell Blanchard (485 points), Daniel Horton (457 points) and Bernard Robinson Jr. (339 points). The leading rebounders were Blanchard (205), Robinson (178) and Graham Brown (138).

LaVell Blanchard won the Big Ten Conference statistical championship with a 43.3% three-point field goal percentage in conference games. The team as a whole also led the big ten in three-point field goal percentage (37.5%) in conference games.

In the 2003 Big Ten Conference men's basketball tournament at the United Center from March 13–16, Michigan was seeded third. In the first round, they had a bye. Then they lost in the second round to number 6 Indiana 63–56.

== Team players drafted into the NBA ==
Year	Round	Pick	Overall	Player	NBA club
2004	2	15	45	Bernard Robinson	Charlotte Bobcats
