= 2002–03 Indiana Hoosiers men's basketball team =

American college basketball season

2002–03 Indiana Hoosiers men's basketball

Maui Invitational champions

NCAA tournament, Round of 32
- Conference: Big Ten Conference
- Record: 21–13 (8–8 Big Ten)
- Head coach: Mike Davis (3rd season)
- Assistant coach: Jim Thomas
- Home arena: Assembly Hall

2002–03 Big Ten Conference men's basketball standings
	Conf.				Overall
Team	W		L	PCT	W		L	PCT
No. 21 Wisconsin	12	–	4	.750	24	–	8	.750
No. 11 Illinois †	11	–	5	.688	25	–	7	.781
Purdue	10	–	6	.625	19	–	11	.633
Michigan State	10	–	6	.625	22	–	13	.629
Michigan	10	–	6	.625	18	–	12	.600
Indiana	8	–	8	.500	21	–	13	.618
Minnesota	8	–	8	.500	19	–	14	.576
Iowa	7	–	9	.438	17	–	14	.548
Ohio State	7	–	9	.438	17	–	15	.531
Northwestern	3	–	13	.188	12	–	17	.414
Penn State	2	–	14	.125	7	–	21	.250
† 2003 Big Ten tournament winner Rankings from AP poll

The 2002–03 Indiana Hoosiers men's basketball team represented Indiana University in the 2002–03 college basketball season. Their head coach was Mike Davis, who was in his third season. The team played its home games at Assembly Hall in Bloomington, Indiana, and was a member of the Big Ten Conference.

Indiana finished the season with an overall record of 21–13 and a conference record of 8–8, good for 6th place in the Big Ten Conference. After beating Penn State in the opening round and Michigan in the quarterfinals, the Hoosiers fell to Illinois (73–72) in the semifinals of the Big Ten tournament. The Hoosiers defeated Alabama 67–62 in the first round of the NCAA tournament before losing to the Pittsburgh Panthers 74–52 in the second round, thus ending the 2002–03 season.

== 2002–03 roster ==
No.	Name	Position	Ht.	Year	Hometown
2	A.J. Moye	G/F	6–3	Jr.	Atlanta
3	Tom Coverdale	G	6–2	Sr.	Noblesville, Indiana
4	Bracey Wright	G	6–3	Fr.	The Colony, Texas
5	George Leach	C	6–11	Jr.	Charlotte, North Carolina
10	Roderick Wilmont	G	6–4	RS Fr.	Miramar, Florida
11	Joe Haarman	F	6–7	Fr.	Cincinnati
12	Donald Perry	G	6–2	So.	Tallulah, Louisiana
21	Mark Johnson	G	6–2	So.	Oregon, Wisconsin
22	Marshall Strickland	G	6–2	Fr.	Mount Airy, Maryland
23	Sean Kline	F	6–8	Fr.	Huntington, Indiana
31	Daryl Pegram	F	6–9	Fr.	Los Angeles
32	Kyle Hornsby	G/F	6–5	Sr.	Anacoco, Louisiana
33	Mike Roberts	F	6–9	So.	Eugene, Oregon
34	Ryan Tapak	G	6–2	So.	Indianapolis, Indiana
40	Jason Stewart	F	6–8	Jr.	Edwardsport, Indiana
50	Jeff Newton	F	6–9	Sr.	Atlanta

== Schedule and results ==
Date time, TV	Rank^{#}	Opponent^{#}	Result	Record	Site city, state
Regular season
11/25/2002*	No. 19	vs. Massachusetts; Maui Invitational Quarterfinals	W 84–71	1–0	Lahaina Civic Center; Lahaina, HI
11/26/2002*	No. 19	vs. No. 20 Gonzaga; Maui Invitational Semifinals	W 76–75	2–0	Lahaina Civic Center; Lahaina, HI
11/27/2002*	No. 19	vs. Virginia; Maui Invitational Championship	W 70–63	3–0	Lahaina Civic Center; Lahaina, HI
12/1/2002*	No. 19	North Texas	W 84–58	4–0	Assembly Hall; Bloomington, Indiana
12/3/2002*	No. 10	vs. No. 9 Maryland; ACC–Big Ten Challenge	W 80–74	5–0	Conseco Fieldhouse; Indianapolis, Indiana
12/7/2002*	No. 10	UIC	W 91–62	6–0	Assembly Hall; Bloomington, Indiana
12/9/2002*	No. 7	Vanderbilt	W 73–56	7–0	Assembly Hall; Bloomington, Indiana
12/14/2002*	No. 7	vs. Purdue; Rivalry/Crimson and Gold Cup/Duel in the Dome	W 66–63	8–0	RCA Dome; Indianapolis
12/21/2002*; CBS	No. 6	vs. No. 16 Kentucky; Indiana–Kentucky rivalry	L 64–70	8–1	Freedom Hall; Louisville, Kentucky
12/28/2002*	No. 10	at Temple	L 64–71	8–2	Liacouras Center; Philadelphia
12/31/2002*	No. 17	at Ball State	W 76–62	9–2	John E. Worthen Arena; Muncie, Indiana
1/4/2003*	No. 16	Charlotte	W 70–60	10–2	Assembly Hall; Bloomington, Indiana
1/8/2003	No. 15	Penn State	W 78–65	11–2 (1–0)	Assembly Hall; Bloomington, Indiana
1/11/2003	No. 15	at Ohio State	L 69–81	11–3 (1–1)	Value City Arena; Columbus, OH
1/15/2003	No. 18	Northwestern	W 71–57	12–3 (2–1)	Assembly Hall; Bloomington, Indiana
1/18/2003; CBS	No. 18	No. 8 Illinois; Rivalry	W 74–66	13–3 (3–1)	Assembly Hall; Bloomington, Indiana
1/21/2003	No. 14	Ohio State	W 69–51	14–3 (4–1)	Assembly Hall; Bloomington, Indiana
1/25/2003	No. 14	at Purdue; Rivalry/Crimson and Gold Cup	L 47–69	14–4 (4–2)	Mackey Arena; West Lafayette, Indiana
1/28/2003	No. 19	at Michigan State	L 54–61	14–5 (4–3)	Breslin Center; East Lansing, Michigan
2/1/2003*; CBS	No. 19	at No. 8 Louisville	L 76–95	14–6 (4–3)	Freedom Hall; Louisville, Kentucky
2/5/2003		at Northwestern	L 61–74	14–7 (4–4)	Welsh-Ryan Arena; Evanston, Illinois
2/8/2003		Michigan State	L 62–67	14–8 (4–5)	Assembly Hall; Bloomington, Indiana
2/12/2003		Michigan	W 63–49	15–8 (5–5)	Assembly Hall; Bloomington, Indiana
2/15/2003; CBS		at Wisconsin	L 59–71	15–9 (5–6)	Kohl Center; Madison, Wisconsin
2/19/2003		Iowa	W 79–63	16–9 (6–6)	Carver–Hawkeye Arena; Iowa City, Iowa
2/25/2003		at No. 18 Illinois; Rivalry	L 54–80	16–10 (6–7)	Assembly Hall; Champaign, Illinois
3/1/2003		Iowa	W 91–88	17–10 (7–7)	Assembly Hall; Bloomington, Indiana
3/4/2003		Minnesota	W 74–70	18–10 (8–7)	Assembly Hall; Bloomington, Indiana
3/8/2003		at Penn State	L 66–74	18–11 (8–8)	Bryce Jordan Center; University Park, Pennsylvania
Big Ten tournament
3/13/2003		vs. Penn State; Opening Round	W 77–49	19–11	United Center; Chicago
3/14/2003		vs. Michigan; Quarterfinals	W 63–56	20–11	United Center; Chicago, IL
3/15/2003; CBS		vs. No. 13 Illinois; Semifinals	L 72–73	20–12	United Center; Chicago, IL
NCAA tournament
3/21/2003*; CBS	No. (7)	vs. No. (10) Alabama; First Round	W 67–62	21–12	TD Garden; Boston, MA
3/23/2003*; CBS	No. (7)	vs. No. 4 (2) Pittsburgh; Second Round	L 52–74	21–13	TD Garden; Boston, MA
*Non-conference game. ^{#}Rankings from AP Poll. (#) Tournament seedings in parentheses.
