= 2002–03 Iowa Hawkeyes men's basketball team =

American college basketball season

2002–03 Iowa Hawkeyes men's basketball

National Invitation Tournament, Quarterfinals
- Conference: Big Ten Conference
- Record: 17–14 (7–9 Big Ten)
- Head coach: Steve Alford (4th season)
- Assistant coaches: Brian Jones; Greg Lansing
- MVP: Chauncey Leslie
- Home arena: Carver–Hawkeye Arena (Capacity: 15,500)

2002–03 Big Ten Conference men's basketball standings
	Conf.				Overall
Team	W		L	PCT	W		L	PCT
No. 21 Wisconsin	12	–	4	.750	24	–	8	.750
No. 11 Illinois †	11	–	5	.688	25	–	7	.781
Purdue	10	–	6	.625	19	–	11	.633
Michigan State	10	–	6	.625	22	–	13	.629
Michigan	10	–	6	.625	18	–	12	.600
Indiana	8	–	8	.500	21	–	13	.618
Minnesota	8	–	8	.500	19	–	14	.576
Iowa	7	–	9	.438	17	–	14	.548
Ohio State	7	–	9	.438	17	–	15	.531
Northwestern	3	–	13	.188	12	–	17	.414
Penn State	2	–	14	.125	7	–	21	.250
† 2003 Big Ten tournament winner Rankings from AP poll

The 2002–03 Iowa Hawkeyes men's basketball team represented the University of Iowa as members of the Big Ten Conference during the 2002–03 NCAA Division I men's basketball season. The team was led by fourth-year head coach Steve Alford and played their home games at Carver–Hawkeye Arena. They finished the season 17–14 overall and 7–9 in Big Ten play.

== Roster ==
2002–03 Iowa Hawkeyes men's basketball team
Players
Coaches

Pos.	#	Name	Height	Weight	Year	Hometown
G	1	Chauncey Leslie	6 ft 0 in (1.83 m)	—	Sr	Rochester, New York
G	2	Jeff Horner	6 ft 3 in (1.91 m)	—	Fr	Mason City, Iowa
G	3	Pierre Pierce	6 ft 4 in (1.93 m)	—	Fr	Westmont, Illinois
F	4	Glen Worley	6 ft 7 in (2.01 m)	—	Jr	Coralville, Iowa
C	5	Jared Reiner	6 ft 11 in (2.11 m)	—	Jr	Tripp, South Dakota
G	11	Brody Boyd	5 ft 11 in (1.8 m)	—	Jr	Dugger, Indiana
F	13	Justin Wieck	6 ft 6 in (1.98 m)	—	Fr	North Liberty, Iowa
C	34	Erek Hansen	6 ft 11 in (2.11 m)	—	Fr	Bedford, Texas
F	44	Greg Brunner	6 ft 7 in (2.01 m)	—	Fr	Charles City, Iowa
C	53	Sean Sonderleiter	6 ft 9 in (2.06 m)	—	Jr	Des Moines, Iowa

Head coach

- Steve Alford (Indiana)

Assistant coach(es)

- Brian Jones (Northern Iowa)
- Greg Lansing (South Dakota)
- Sam Alford

Legend

- (C) Team captain
- (S) Suspended
- (I) Ineligible
- (W) Walk-on
- Injured
- Current redshirt

== Schedule/Results ==
Date time, TV	Rank^{#}	Opponent^{#}	Result	Record	Site city, state
Non-conference regular season
11/24/2002*		Florida Atlantic	W 79–52	1–0	Carver-Hawkeye Arena; Iowa City, IA
11/26/2002*		at Drake; Iowa Big Four	W 50–49	2–0	Knapp Center; Des Moines, IA
12/13/2002*		Iowa State; Rivalry	L 69–73	6–2	Carver-Hawkeye Arena; Iowa City, IA
Big Ten Regular Season
1/15/2003		No. 8 Illinois	W 68–61	11–3 (3–0)	Carver-Hawkeye Arena; Iowa City, IA
3/8/2003		Northwestern	W 77–61	15–12 (7–9)	Carver-Hawkeye Arena; Iowa City, IA
Big Ten tournament
3/13/2003		vs. Ohio State	L 64–66	15–13	United Center; Chicago, IL
National Invitation Tournament
3/17/2003*		Valparaiso; First Round	W 62–60	16–13	Carver-Hawkeye Arena; Iowa City, IA
3/21/2003*		at Iowa State; Second Round (Rivalry)	W 54–53	17–13	Hilton Coliseum; Ames, IA
3/24/2003*		Georgia Tech; Third Round	L 78–79	17–14	Carver-Hawkeye Arena; Iowa City, IA
*Non-conference game. ^{#}Rankings from AP Poll. (#) Tournament seedings in parentheses.
