= 2002–03 Ohio State Buckeyes men's basketball team =

American college basketball season

2002–03 Ohio State Buckeyes men's basketball

NIT, First Round
- Conference: Big Ten
- Record: 17–15 (7–9 Big Ten)
- Head coach: Jim O'Brien (6th season)
- Home arena: Value City Arena

2002–03 Big Ten Conference men's basketball standings
	Conf.				Overall
Team	W		L	PCT	W		L	PCT
No. 21 Wisconsin	12	–	4	.750	24	–	8	.750
No. 11 Illinois †	11	–	5	.688	25	–	7	.781
Purdue	10	–	6	.625	19	–	11	.633
Michigan State	10	–	6	.625	22	–	13	.629
Michigan	10	–	6	.625	18	–	12	.600
Indiana	8	–	8	.500	21	–	13	.618
Minnesota	8	–	8	.500	19	–	14	.576
Iowa	7	–	9	.438	17	–	14	.548
Ohio State	7	–	9	.438	17	–	15	.531
Northwestern	3	–	13	.188	12	–	17	.414
Penn State	2	–	14	.125	7	–	21	.250
† 2003 Big Ten tournament winner Rankings from AP poll

The 2002–03 Ohio State Buckeyes men's basketball finished 8th in the Big Ten regular season standing but made it the championship game of the Big Ten tournament for the second consecutive time. The Buckeyes went to the NIT where they lost to Georgia Tech in the first round.

== Roster ==
=== Starting lineup ===
Position	Player	Class
	Brent Darby	
	Sean Connolly	
	Devin Patterson	
	Zach Williams	
	Matt Sylvester/Shun Jenkins	
