= 2003 Big Ten men's basketball tournament =

- Classification: Division I
- Season: 2002–03
- Teams: 11
- Site: United Center; Chicago, Illinois
- Champions: Illinois Fighting Illini (1st title)
- Winning coach: Bill Self (1st title)
- MVP: Brian Cook (Illinois)

2002–03 Big Ten Conference men's basketball standings
	Conf.				Overall
Team	W		L	PCT	W		L	PCT
No. 21 Wisconsin	12	–	4	.750	24	–	8	.750
No. 11 Illinois †	11	–	5	.688	25	–	7	.781
Purdue	10	–	6	.625	19	–	11	.633
Michigan State	10	–	6	.625	22	–	13	.629
Michigan	10	–	6	.625	18	–	12	.600
Indiana	8	–	8	.500	21	–	13	.618
Minnesota	8	–	8	.500	19	–	14	.576
Iowa	7	–	9	.438	17	–	14	.548
Ohio State	7	–	9	.438	17	–	15	.531
Northwestern	3	–	13	.188	12	–	17	.414
Penn State	2	–	14	.125	7	–	21	.250
† 2003 Big Ten tournament winner Rankings from AP poll

The 2003 Big Ten men's basketball tournament was the postseason men's basketball tournament for the Big Ten Conference and played between March 13 and March 16, 2003 at United Center in Chicago, Illinois. The championship was won by Illinois who defeated Ohio State in the championship game. As a result, Illinois received the Big Ten's automatic bid to the NCAA tournament. The win marked Illinois' first tournament championship following two prior championship game appearances.

== Seeds ==
All Big Ten schools played in the tournament. Teams were seeded by conference record, with a tiebreaker system used to seed teams with identical conference records. Seeding for the tournament was determined at the close of the regular conference season. The top five teams received a first round bye.

Seed	School	Conference
1	Wisconsin	12–4
2	Illinois	11–5
3	Michigan	10–6
4	Purdue	10–6
5	Michigan State	10–6
6	Indiana	8–8
7	Minnesota	8–8
8	Ohio State	7–9
9	Iowa	7–9
10	Northwestern	3–13
11	Penn State	2–14

== Bracket ==
Opening round March 13
8	Ohio State	66
9	Iowa	64
7	Minnesota	64
10	Northwestern	76
6	Indiana	77
11	Penn State	49

Quarterfinals; March 14
1	#18 Wisconsin	50
8	Ohio State	58
4	Purdue	42
5	Michigan State	54
2	#13 Illinois	94
10	Northwestern	65
3	Michigan	56
6	Indiana	63

Semifinals; March 15
8	Ohio State	55
5	Michigan State	54
2	#13 Illinois	73
6	Indiana	72

Championship; March 16
8	Ohio State	59
2	#13 Illinois	72

== Honors ==
=== All-Tournament Team ===
- Brian Cook, Illinois – Big Ten tournament Most Outstanding Player
- Roger Powell, Illinois
- Tom Coverdale, Indiana
- Brent Darby, Ohio State
- Sean Connolly, Ohio State
