= 2002–03 Wisconsin Badgers men's basketball team =

American college basketball season

2002–03 Wisconsin Badgers men's basketball

Big Ten Regular Season Champions

NCAA tournament, Sweet Sixteen
- Conference: Big Ten Conference

Ranking
- Coaches: No. 14
- AP: No. 21
- Record: 24–8 (12–4 Big Ten)
- Head coach: Bo Ryan (2nd season)
- Associate head coach: Rob Jeter
- Assistant coaches: Greg Gard; Tony Bennett
- Home arena: Kohl Center

2002–03 Big Ten Conference men's basketball standings
| | Conf. | | | | Overall |
| Team | W | | L | PCT | W | | L | PCT |
|---|---|---|---|---|---|---|---|---|
| No. 21 Wisconsin | 12 | – | 4 | .750 | 24 | – | 8 | .750 |
| No. 11 Illinois † | 11 | – | 5 | .688 | 25 | – | 7 | .781 |
| Purdue | 10 | – | 6 | .625 | 19 | – | 11 | .633 |
| Michigan State | 10 | – | 6 | .625 | 22 | – | 13 | .629 |
| Michigan | 10 | – | 6 | .625 | 18 | – | 12 | .600 |
| Indiana | 8 | – | 8 | .500 | 21 | – | 13 | .618 |
| Minnesota | 8 | – | 8 | .500 | 19 | – | 14 | .576 |
| Iowa | 7 | – | 9 | .438 | 17 | – | 14 | .548 |
| Ohio State | 7 | – | 9 | .438 | 17 | – | 15 | .531 |
| Northwestern | 3 | – | 13 | .188 | 12 | – | 17 | .414 |
| Penn State | 2 | – | 14 | .125 | 7 | – | 21 | .250 |
† 2003 Big Ten tournament winner Rankings from AP poll

The 2002–03 Wisconsin Badgers men's basketball team represented University of Wisconsin–Madison as a member of the Big Ten Conference during the 2002–03 NCAA Division I men's basketball season. The head coach was Bo Ryan, coaching his second season with the Badgers. The team played its home games at the Kohl Center in Madison, Wisconsin. Wisconsin finished 24–8, 12–4 in Big Ten play to finish as outright regular season champions for the first time since 1947.

In the quarterfinals of the Big Ten tournament in Chicago, top-seeded Wisconsin was upset by Ohio State. The Badgers received an at-large bid to the NCAA tournament as the fifth seed in the Midwest Region, where they won twice in Spokane, then lost to No. 1 seed Kentucky by six points in the Sweet Sixteen at Minneapolis.

== Roster ==
2002–03 Wisconsin Badgers men's basketball team
Players
Coaches

| Pos. | # | Name | Height | Weight | Year | Hometown |
|---|---|---|---|---|---|---|
| G | 3 | Ike Ukawuba | 6 ft 3 in (1.91 m) | 175 lb (79 kg) | Jr | Chicago, IL |
| F | 4 | Ray Nixon | 6 ft 7 in (2.01 m) | 205 lb (93 kg) | Fr | Milwaukee, WI |
| F/C | 5 | Jason Chappell | 6 ft 10 in (2.08 m) | 230 lb (104 kg) | Fr | New Berlin, WI |
| G | 11 | John Emerson (W) | 6 ft 4 in (1.93 m) | 195 lb (88 kg) | Fr | New Richmond, WI |
| G | 12 | Boo Wade | 6 ft 3 in (1.91 m) | 185 lb (84 kg) | Fr | Milwaukee, WI |
| G | 13 | Clayton Hanson (W) | 6 ft 5 in (1.96 m) | 185 lb (84 kg) | So | Reedsburg, WI |
| G | 20 | Kirk Penney | 6 ft 5 in (1.96 m) | 220 lb (100 kg) | Sr | Auckland |
| F | 21 | Andreas Helmigk | 6 ft 9 in (2.06 m) | 245 lb (111 kg) | RS Fr | Klagenfurt |
| G | 24 | Freddie Owens | 6 ft 2 in (1.88 m) | 185 lb (84 kg) | Jr | Milwaukee, WI |
| C | 30 | Dave Mader | 6 ft 11 in (2.11 m) | 255 lb (116 kg) | RS Jr | Appleton, WI |
| F | 32 | Deandre Buchanan (W) | 6 ft 5 in (1.96 m) | 195 lb (88 kg) | So | Verona, WI |
| G | 34 | Devin Harris | 6 ft 3 in (1.91 m) | 185 lb (84 kg) | So | Milwaukee, WI |
| G/F | 42 | Alando Tucker | 6 ft 5 in (1.96 m) | 195 lb (88 kg) | Fr | Lockport, IL |
| F | 44 | Zach Morley | 6 ft 8 in (2.03 m) | 220 lb (100 kg) | Jr | Maryville, MO |
| F | 54 | Mike Wilkinson | 6 ft 8 in (2.03 m) | 235 lb (107 kg) | RS So | Blue Mounds, WI |

Head coach

- Bo Ryan (Wilkes)

Assistant coach(es)

- Rob Jeter (UW-Platteville)
- Greg Gard (UW-Platteville)
- Tony Bennett (UW-Green Bay)

Legend

- (C) Team captain
- (S) Suspended
- (I) Ineligible
- (W) Walk-on
- Injured
- Current redshirt

Roster
Last update: 2014-1-11

== Schedule ==
| Date time, TV | Rank^{#} | Opponent^{#} | Result | Record | Site city, state |
Regular Season
| 11/15/2002*; 8:00 pm | | Eastern Washington; NABC Classic | W 81–55 | 1–0 | Kohl Center; Madison, WI |
| 11/16/2002*; 8:00 pm | | Northern Illinois; NABC Classic | W 84–56 | 2–0 | Kohl Center; Madison, WI |
| 11/23/2002*; 7:00 pm | | Milwaukee | W 83–72 | 3–0 | Kohl Center; Madison, WI |
| 11/30/2002*; 1:05 pm | No. 25 | at UW–Green Bay | W 69–52 | 4–0 | Resch Center; Green Bay, WI |
| 12/04/2002*; 8:30 pm, ESPN2 | No. 23 | Wake Forest; ACC–Big Ten Challenge | L 80–90 | 4–1 | Kohl Center; Madison, WI |
| 12/07/2002*; 11:00 am, FSN | No. 23 | UNLV | W 91–74 | 5–1 | Kohl Center; Madison, WI |
| 12/11/2002*; 7:00 pm | | New Hampshire | W 85–36 | 6–1 | Kohl Center; Madison, WI |
| 12/14/2002*; 7:30 pm, FSN | | at No. 16 Marquette | L 54–63 | 6–2 | Bradley Center; Milwaukee, WI |
| 12/21/2002*; 12:00 pm, FSN | | Texas Southern | W 81–58 | 7–2 | Kohl Center; Madison, WI |
| 12/23/2002*; 7:00 pm | | Ohio | W 75–51 | 8–2 | Kohl Center; Madison, WI |
| 1/02/2003*; 6:00 pm | | at Temple | W 80–67 | 9–2 | Liacouras Center; Philadelphia, PA |
| 1/04/2003*; 12:00 pm | | Chicago State | W 73–45 | 10–2 | Kohl Center; Madison, WI |
| 1/08/2003; 7:00 pm, ESPN | | at Michigan | L 65-66 | 10–3 (0–1) | Crisler Arena; Ann Arbor, MI |
| 1/11/2003; 3:37 pm, ESPN+ | | at No. 10 Illinois | L 63–69 | 10–4 (0–2) | Assembly Hall; Champaign, IL |
| 1/15/2003; 7:00 pm, ESPN | | Minnesota | W 66–50 | 11–4 (1–2) | Kohl Center; Madison, WI |
| 1/18/2003; 7:00 pm, ESPN | | at Ohio State | W 53–52 | 12–4 (2–2) | Value City Arena; Columbus, OH |
| 1/22/2003; 7:00 pm, ESPN | | Iowa | W 74–61 | 13–4 (3–2) | Kohl Center; Madison, WI |
| 1/29/2003; 7:00 pm, FSN | | Northwestern | W 69–50 | 14–4 (4–2) | Kohl Center; Madison, WI |
| 2/01/2003; 3:37 pm, ESPN+ | | Penn State | W 86–55 | 15–4 (5–2) | Kohl Center; Madison, WI |
| 2/05/2003; 6:00 pm, ESPN | | at No. 24 Purdue | L 60–78 | 15–5 (5–3) | Mackey Arena; West Lafayette, IN |
| 2/08/2003; 1:00 pm, ESPN | | at Northwestern | W 74–59 | 16–5 (6–3) | Welsh-Ryan Arena; Evanston, IL |
| 2/11/2003; 6:00 pm, ESPN | | Michigan State | W 64–53 | 17–5 (7–3) | Kohl Center; Madison, WI |
| 2/15/2003; 12:00 pm, CBS | | Indiana | W 71–59 | 18–5 (8–3) | Kohl Center; Madison, WI |
| 2/19/2003; 7:00 pm, FSN | | at Penn State | L 57–58 | 18–6 (8–4) | Bryce Jordan Center; University Park, PA |
| 2/22/2003; 3:00 pm, ESPN | | at Iowa | W 61–53 | 19–6 (9–4) | Carver–Hawkeye Arena; Iowa City, IA |
| 2/26/2003; 8:00 pm, ESPN | | Michigan | W 73–42 | 20–6 (10–4) | Kohl Center; Madison, WI |
| 3/02/2003; 1:00 pm, CBS | | at Minnesota | W 69–61 | 21–6 (11–4) | Williams Arena; Minneapolis, MN |
| 3/05/2003; 8:00 pm, FSN | No. 24 | No. 14 Illinois | W 60–59 | 22–6 (12–4) | Kohl Center; Madison, WI |
Big Ten tournament
| 3/14/2003; 11:00 am, ESPN | (1) No. 18 | vs. (8) Ohio State; Big Ten tournament – quarterfinals | L 50–58 | 22–7 | United Center; Chicago, IL |
NCAA tournament
| 3/20/2003*; 6:25 pm, CBS | (5 MW) No. 21 | vs. (12) Weber State; First Round | W 81–74 | 23–7 | Spokane Veterans Memorial Arena; Spokane, WA |
| 3/22/2003*; 4:53 pm, CBS | (5 MW) No. 21 | vs. (13 MW) Tulsa; Second Round | W 61–60 | 24–7 | Spokane Veterans Memorial Arena; Spokane, WA |
| 3/27/2003*; 6:10 pm, CBS | (5 MW) No. 21 | vs. (1 MW) Kentucky; Sweet Sixteen | L 57–63 | 24–8 | Hubert H. Humphrey Metrodome; Minneapolis, MN |
*Non-conference game. ^{#}Rankings from AP poll. (#) Tournament seedings in parentheses.
