= 2002–03 Purdue Boilermakers men's basketball team =

American college basketball season

2002–03 Purdue Boilermakers men's basketball

NCAA tournament, second round
- Conference: Big Ten Conference
- Record: 19–11 (10–6 Big Ten)
- Head coach: Gene Keady (23rd season)
- Assistant coaches: Todd Foster; Jay Price; Cuonzo Martin
- Home arena: Mackey Arena

2002–03 Big Ten Conference men's basketball standings
	Conf.				Overall
Team	W		L	PCT	W		L	PCT
No. 21 Wisconsin	12	–	4	.750	24	–	8	.750
No. 11 Illinois †	11	–	5	.688	25	–	7	.781
Purdue	10	–	6	.625	19	–	11	.633
Michigan State	10	–	6	.625	22	–	13	.629
Michigan	10	–	6	.625	18	–	12	.600
Indiana	8	–	8	.500	21	–	13	.618
Minnesota	8	–	8	.500	19	–	14	.576
Iowa	7	–	9	.438	17	–	14	.548
Ohio State	7	–	9	.438	17	–	15	.531
Northwestern	3	–	13	.188	12	–	17	.414
Penn State	2	–	14	.125	7	–	21	.250
† 2003 Big Ten tournament winner Rankings from AP poll

The 2002–03 Purdue Boilermakers men's basketball team represented Purdue University as a member of the Big Ten Conference during the 2002–03 NCAA Division I men's basketball season. The team was led by Gene Keady and played its home games at Mackey Arena.

== Roster ==
2002–03 Purdue Boilermakers men's basketball team
Players
Coaches

Pos.	#	Name	Height	Weight	Year	Previous school	Hometown
G	0	Willie Deane	6 ft 1 in (1.85 m)	190 lb (86 kg)	Sr	Boston College	Schenectady, New York
G	20	Kenny Lowe	6 ft 3 in (1.91 m)	197 lb (89 kg)	Jr		Gary, Indiana
F	31	Chris Booker	6 ft 10 in (2.08 m)	247 lb (112 kg)	Jr	Tyler JC	Fort Worth, Texas
G	33	Darmetreis Kilgore	6 ft 5 in (1.96 m)	204 lb (93 kg)	Sr		South Bend, Indiana
G	2	David Teague	6 ft 5 in (1.96 m)	196 lb (89 kg)	Fr	Bridgton Academy	Indianapolis, Indiana
F	3	Brett Buscher	6 ft 8 in (2.03 m)	242 lb (110 kg)	Jr		Chesterton, Indiana
G	10	Brandon McKnight	6 ft 2 in (1.88 m)	191 lb (87 kg)	So		South Bend, Indiana
F	3	Melvin Buckley	6 ft 7 in (2.01 m)	215 lb (98 kg)	Fr		Chicago, Illinois
F	42	Matt Kiefer	6 ft 10 in (2.08 m)	233 lb (106 kg)	Fr		Evansville, Indiana
C	5	Ivan Kartelo	6 ft 11 in (2.11 m)	265 lb (120 kg)	Jr
G	11	Austin Parkinson	6 ft 0 in (1.83 m)	187 lb (85 kg)	Jr		Kokomo, Indiana
C	34	Kevin Garrity	6 ft 11 in (2.11 m)	250 lb (113 kg)	Jr		North Brunswick, New Jersey
G	4	Andrew Ford	6 ft 2 in (1.88 m)	195 lb (88 kg)			West Lafayette, Indiana

Head coach

- Gene Keady (Kansas State)

Assistant coach(es)

Legend

- (C) Team captain
- (S) Suspended
- (I) Ineligible
- (W) Walk-on
- Injured
- Current redshirt

== Schedule and results ==
Date time, TV	Rank^{#}	Opponent^{#}	Result	Record	Site city, state
Exhibition
Nov 5, 2002*; 7:00 PM		Harlem Globetrotters	L 64–83	–	Mackey Arena; West Lafayette, Indiana
Nov 15, 2002*; 7:00 PM		Team Nike	W 79–62	–	Mackey Arena; West Lafayette, Indiana
Regular Season
Nov 22, 2002*; 9:00 PM		Miami (OH)	W 73–46	1–0	Mackey Arena; West Lafayette, Indiana
Nov 30, 2002*; 3:30 PM		vs. Louisville; Wooden Tradition	W 86–84	2–0	Conseco Fieldhouse; Indianapolis, Indiana
Dec 3, 2002*; 7:30 PM		at No. 16 Xavier	L 59–74	2–1	Cintas Center; Cincinnati, Ohio
Dec 6, 2002*; 8:00 PM		Middle Tennessee; Boilermaker Invitational	W 85–56	3–1	Mackey Arena; West Lafayette, Indiana
Dec 7, 2002*; 8:00 PM		San Diego; Boilermaker Invitational	W 95–65	4–1	Mackey Arena; West Lafayette, Indiana
Dec 14, 2002*; 8:00 PM		vs. No. 7 Indiana; Rivalry/Titan Series/Duel in the Dome	L 63–66	4–2	RCA Dome; Indianapolis, Indiana
Dec 18, 2002*; 7:00 PM		Belmont	W 78–61	5–2	Mackey Arena; West Lafayette, Indiana
Dec 21, 2002*; 10:00 PM		vs. Arizona State; Las Vegas Showdown	L 53–70	5–3	Thomas & Mack Center; Las Vegas, Nevada
Dec 28, 2002*; 1:00 PM		Valparaiso	W 87–55	6–3	Mackey Arena; West Lafayette, Indiana
Dec 30, 2002*; 7:00 PM		Colorado State	W 84–56	7–3	Mackey Arena; West Lafayette, Indiana
January 4, 2003*; 2:00 PM		Montana	W 84–66	8–3	Mackey Arena; West Lafayette, Indiana
January 11, 2003; 12:17 PM		Northwestern	W 82–68	9–3 (1–0)	Mackey Arena; West Lafayette, Indiana
January 14, 2003; 7:00 PM		Michigan State	W 72–60	10–3 (2–0)	Mackey Arena; West Lafayette, Indiana
January 18, 2003; 12:07 PM		at Penn State	W 82–78	11–3 (3–0)	Bryce Jordan Center; State College, Pennsylvania
January 22, 2003; 7:30 PM		at No. 18 Illinois	L 62–75	11–4 (3–1)	Assembly Hall; Champaign, Illinois
January 25, 2003; 4:37 PM		No. 14 Indiana; Rivalry/Titan Series	W 69–47	12–4 (4–1)	Mackey Arena; West Lafayette, Indiana
January 29, 2003; 8:00 PM		Ohio State	W 70–65	13–4 (5–1)	Mackey Arena; West Lafayette, Indiana
February 1, 2003; 8:00 PM		at Iowa	W 80–77 ^{OT}	14–4 (6–1)	Carver–Hawkeye Arena; Iowa City, Iowa
February 5, 2003; 7:00 PM	No. 24	Wisconsin	W 78–60	15–4 (7–1)	Mackey Arena; West Lafayette, Indiana
February 8, 2003; 2:34 PM	No. 24	at Minnesota	L 68–90	15–5 (7–2)	Williams Arena; Minneapolis, Minnesota
February 12, 2003; 9:00 PM		at Northwestern	L 67–78	15–6 (7–3)	Welsh-Ryan Arena; Evanston, Illinois
February 15, 2003; 8:00 PM		No. 14 Illinois	W 70–61	16–6 (8–3)	Mackey Arena; West Lafayette, Indiana
February 19, 2003; 7:00 PM	No. 24	Michigan	L 67–78	16–7 (8–4)	Mackey Arena; West Lafayette, Indiana
February 22, 2003; 12:07 PM	No. 24	at Ohio State	L 44–52	16–8 (8–5)	Value City Arena; Columbus, Ohio
February 26, 2003; 8:00 PM		Penn State	W 79–55	17–8 (9–5)	Mackey Arena; West Lafayette, Indiana
March 1, 2003; 2:34 PM		at Michigan State	L 61–69	17–9 (9–6)	Breslin Center; East Lansing, Michigan
Mar 8, 2003; 4:30 PM		at Michigan	W 69–61	18–9 (10–6)	Crisler Arena; Ann Arbor, Michigan
Big Ten tournament
Mar 14, 2003*; 2:30 PM	(4)	vs. (5) Michigan State; Quarterfinals	L 42–54	18–10	United Center; Chicago, Illinois
NCAA Tournament
Mar 21, 2003*; 3:00 PM	(9 S)	vs. (8 S) LSU; First Round	W 80–56	19–10	Birmingham-Jefferson Civic Center; Birmingham, Alabama
Mar 23, 2003*; 4:50 PM	(9 S)	vs. (1 S) No. 5 Texas; Second Round	L 67–77	19–11	Birmingham-Jefferson Civic Center; Birmingham, Alabama
*Non-conference game. ^{#}Rankings from AP Poll. (#) Tournament seedings in parentheses. S=South. All times are in Eastern.
