= Bill Self =

American basketball coach (born 1962)

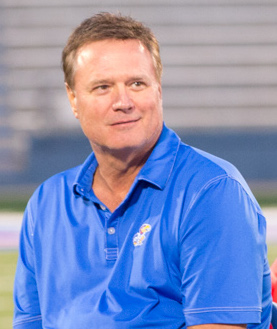
- Self in 2016

Current position
- Title: Head coach
- Team: Kansas
- Conference: Big 12
- Record: 638–167 (.793) (Note: Kansas had 15 wins, their 2018 Big 12 Regular Season and Tournament championships, and 2018 Final Four appearance vacated in 2023. These totals are not included here.)
- Annual salary: $13 million

Biographical details
- Born: December 27, 1962 (age 63); Okmulgee, Oklahoma, U.S.

Playing career
- 1981–1985: Oklahoma State

Coaching career (HC unless noted)
- 1985–1986: Kansas (assistant)
- 1986–1993: Oklahoma State (assistant)
- 1993–1997: Oral Roberts
- 1997–2000: Tulsa
- 2000–2003: Illinois
- 2003–present: Kansas

Head coaching record
- Overall: 845–272 (.756)
- Tournaments: 52–23 (NCAA Division I); 0–1 (NIT)

Accomplishments and honors

Championships
- 2 NCAA Division I tournament (2008, 2022); 3 NCAA Division I regional – Final Four (2008, 2012, 2018*, 2022); 2 WAC regular season (1999, 2000); Big Ten tournament (2003); 2 Big Ten regular season (2001, 2002); 9 Big 12 tournament (2006–2008, 2010, 2011, 2013, 2016, 2018*, 2022); 17 Big 12 regular season (2005–2018*, 2020, 2022, 2023)

Awards
- 2× AP College Coach of the Year (2009, 2016); NABC Coach of the Year (2016); Naismith College Coach of the Year (2012); USBWA District Coach of the Year 2022; Adolph Rupp Cup (2012); 6× Big 12 Coach of the Year (2006, 2009, 2011, 2012, 2017, 2018); 5× AP Big 12 Coach of the Year (2006, 2009, 2011, 2015, 2016); John R. Wooden Legends of Coaching Award (2013); Henry Iba Award (2009); WAC Coach of the Year (2000); Oklahoma Sports Hall of Fame (2013)
- Basketball Hall of Fame; Inducted in 2017 (profile)
Medal record
Head coach for United States
Summer Universiade
Gold medal – first place	2015 Gwangju	Team competition
Head coach for United States
FIBA U18 Championship
Gold medal – first place	2018 St. Catharines	Team competition

Billy Eugene Self Jr. (born December 27, 1962) is an American basketball coach who is the head coach of the Kansas Jayhawks men's basketball team. Self has held various coaching roles at the collegiate level and has been the coach of the Jayhawks since 2003.

At Kansas, Self has led the team to 16 Big 12 regular season championships (including an NCAA record-tying 13 consecutive Big 12 regular season championships), three NCAA Final Four appearances (2008, 2012, 2018*, 2022; *the 2018 appearance was vacated due to recruiting violations), and to the NCAA Championship in 2008 and 2022. Through February 7, 2026, Self has a record of 342-22 (.940 win percentage) at Allen Fieldhouse, and he has had three home winning streaks of more than 30 wins (including a school-record and 11th-best all-time 69 game streak). During his tenure at Kansas, he has recruited several McDonald's All-Americans and coached many players who went onto the NBA.

Self was inducted into the Naismith Memorial Basketball Hall of Fame in 2017. At the end of the 2021–22 season, Self had the 18th most wins among Division I coaches in NCAA history and 4th among active head coaches. He is the winningest coach in Kansas history, having passed Hall of Famer Phog Allen on November 12, 2024, and is the only coach in Kansas history to lead Kansas to multiple NCAA Tournament National Championships. Self was the highest paid NCAA basketball coach for the 2021–22 season earning $10,184,282. He signed a lifetime contract extension with the Jayhawks in 2021. In 2022, Self became the seventh coach to win multiple NCAA tournament championships since the tournament field expanded to 64 teams in 1985.

== Early life ==
Bill Eugene Self Jr. was born in Okmulgee, Oklahoma, where his father was the girls' basketball coach at nearby Morris High School. Self attended Edmond Memorial High School, where he was named Oklahoma High School Basketball Player of the Year in 1981.

== Playing career ==
Self received a basketball scholarship to play at Oklahoma State University. He was a letter winner all four years he played. He graduated with a bachelor's degree in business in 1985 and a master's degree in athletic administration in 1989, both from Oklahoma State.

=== Statistics ===
Season	GP	GS	FGM	FGA	FG%	FTM	FTA	FT%	PPG	RPG	APG
1981–82	24	1	31	73	.425	14	18	.778	3.2	0.9	1.0
1982–83	31	9	68	140	.486	41	60	.683	5.7	1.9	2.0
1983–84	26	23	80	176	.455	52	69	.754	8.2	3.2	4.8
1984–85	28	20	89	187	.476	44	69	.638	7.9	2.1	3.9
Career	109	53	268	576	.465	151	216	.699	6.3	2.0	2.9

== Collegiate coaching history ==
=== Early coaching jobs ===
In 1985, Self joined Larry Brown's coaching staff at the University of Kansas. He remained at Kansas as an assistant coach for the 1985–1986 season. Between 1986 and 1993, Self was an assistant coach at Oklahoma State University under Leonard Hamilton, followed by Eddie Sutton. Self's first head coaching position came at Oral Roberts who hired him in 1993. In his first season at ORU, the team managed only six wins. Things improved slightly the following year, when ORU won ten games. In Self's third season, he guided the Golden Eagles to an 18–9 record, and in his fourth season, (1996–1997), ORU registered a 21–7 record as the school made its first postseason tournament appearance since its 1983–1984 appearance in the National Invitation Tournament.

After rebuilding the Golden Eagles, Self was hired by crosstown rival Tulsa and spent three seasons (1998 to 2000) there, compiling a Tulsa-best 74–27 record. While at TU, Self coached the Golden Hurricane to consecutive NCAA tournament appearances in 1999 and 2000. In the 1999–2000 season, in addition to setting a school single-season record for victories by compiling a 32–5 record, Self led the Golden Hurricane to its first-ever Elite Eight appearance.

On June 9, 2000, Illinois named Self the head coach of their basketball program. In Self's three seasons in Illinois, he led the Fighting Illini to two Big Ten regular-season championships, a Big Ten tournament title, and three straight NCAA tournament appearances.

=== Kansas ===
Kansas hired Self as head coach in 2003. He took over for Roy Williams who left for his former team, North Carolina, after KU lost the 2003 National Championship game to Syracuse. In his first season at Kansas, Self led the Jayhawks to the Elite Eight in the NCAA tournament, where they fell to Georgia Tech. In August 2008, Self signed a new 10-year contract guaranteeing him $3 million annually, making him the second-highest-paid coach in college basketball at the time, following Florida's Billy Donovan.

Between 2007 and 2011, Self's KU teams won 165 games, an average of 33.0 wins a year, passing Mike Krzyzewski of Duke (164 wins, 32.8 a year from 1998 to 2002) and Jerry Tarkanian of UNLV (163 wins, 32.6 a year from 1987 to 1991) for the highest 5-year win total of any men's basketball coach in Division I history.

In the 2010–11 season, Self led the Jayhawks past North Carolina to end the season at number 2 on the all-time wins list, trailing leader Kentucky by 14 games (List of teams with the most victories in NCAA Division I men's college basketball). The Jayhawks entered the 2012 NCAA tournament as a #2-seed in the Midwest Regional and ultimately lost in the championship game to Kentucky 67–59. The Jayhawks concluded the year with a 32–7 record, and Self was named the Naismith Coach of the Year. On November 18, 2016, after an 86–65 win over Siena, Self passed Ted Owens for most wins at Allen Fieldhouse with 207. On December 6, 2016, Self achieved his 600th win with a 105–62 win over UMKC. He is the 9th fastest coach in NCAA history to win 600 games. On February 18, 2017, Self was announced as one of 14 finalists named from over 100 candidates to be inducted into the Naismith Memorial Basketball Hall of Fame in his first year of eligibility. The inductees were announced April 3 prior to the National Championship game. Under Bill Self, the Kansas Jayhawks tied the NCAA record for most consecutive conference regular-season titles in college basketball history with 13 straight Big 12 titles. That streak ran from the 2004-05 season through the 2016-17 season. Although Self and the Jayhawks won the Big 12 regular-season conference title again in 2017-2018, this win no longer counts towards the all-time record. In 2023, due to recruiting violations, 15 of the Jayhawks wins from the 2017–18 season, their Final Four appearance, Big 12 regular season title, and Big 12 Tournament title were all vacated by the NCAA.

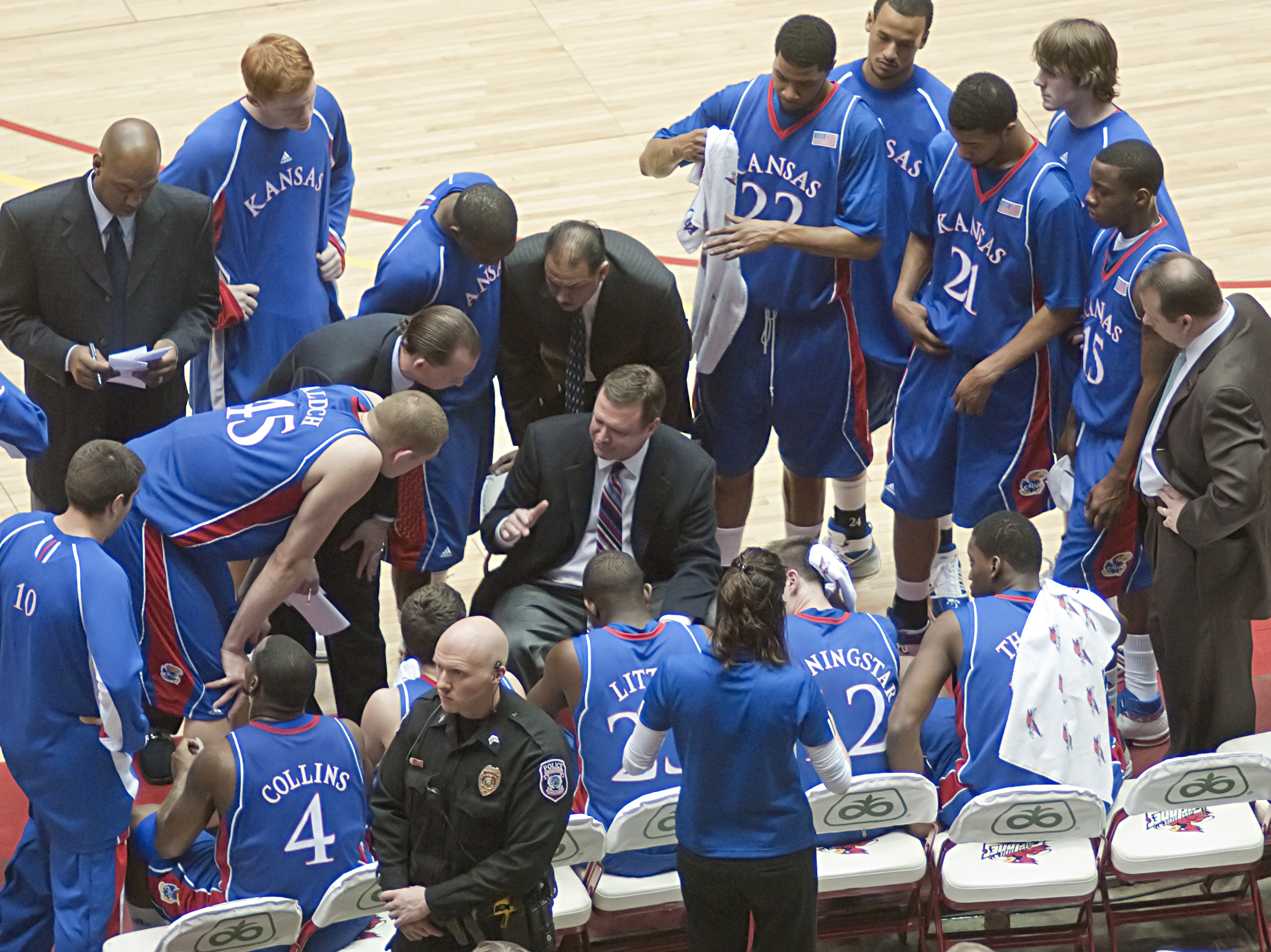
Self coaching Jayhawks players during a timeout in 2009

In September 2019, Self and the Kansas program were served a Notice of Allegations by the NCAA for five Level 1 violations, a head coach responsibility charge against Self personally, and a lack of institutional control charge against the University of Kansas. Self's individual punishments could include a suspension or an effective ban from college basketball for several years or more (a "show cause" penalty against any program looking to hire Self). Self has denied throughout the investigation that the Kansas coaching staff knew Adidas was paying recruits to go there. In October 2023, the NCAA's Independent Resolution Panel dismissed all five Level 1 violations. Kansas Basketball vacated 15 victories and a Final Four appearance for what was ruled a minor Level 3 infraction.

On April 2, 2021, Self signed a lifetime contract with Kansas. Every year after the initial five years, an extra year will be automatically added to the contract and that will continue until he retires or dies. The financial terms of the contract were not immediately disclosed. During the 2021–22 season, Self led Kansas to its fourth NCAA National Championship in program history, capped by a 72–69 victory over North Carolina in the National Championship game on April 4, 2022. The Jayhawks overcame a 16-point deficit and a 15-point halftime deficit to win, both NCAA title game records. By winning the title, combined with the retirements of Mike Krzyzewski and Jay Wright at the end of the season, Self moved into a tie with Rick Pitino as the only active coaches with two national championships.

On November 2, the University of Kansas suspended Self for the first four games of the 2022–23 season for the same Level 3 infraction that resulted in 15 forfeited games. The suspension included the team's Champions Classic game against Duke. Just before the start of the Big 12 Tournament, Self endured a health issue and was unable to coach the Jayhawks for the postseason. Kansas assistant Norm Roberts took over. The Jayhawks would go on to the title game of the Big 12 tournament, losing to Texas. They received the one seed in the west region, beating Howard before losing to Arkansas.

On November 7, 2023, Self signed an amended lifetime contract with Kansas. The contract was signed to continue being a lifetime contract, however, the amended contract gave him a raise to make him the highest paid coach in the country.

In April 2026, after discussing his past health scares and his future in coaching with family and doctors, Self announced he would return to Kansas for the 2026–27 season.

== Head coaching record ==
Record table
Season	Team	Overall	Conference	Standing	Postseason
Oral Roberts Golden Eagles (NCAA Division I Independent) (1993–1997)
1993–94	Oral Roberts	6–21			
1994–95	Oral Roberts	10–17			
1995–96	Oral Roberts	18–9			
1996–97	Oral Roberts	21–7			NIT First Round
Oral Roberts:		55–54 (.505)			
Tulsa Golden Hurricane (Western Athletic Conference) (1997–2000)
1997–98	Tulsa	19–12	9–5	3rd (Pacific)	
1998–99	Tulsa	23–10	9–5	T–1st (Mountain)	NCAA Division I Round of 32
1999–00	Tulsa	32–5	12–2	1st	NCAA Division I Elite Eight
Tulsa:		74–27 (.733)	30–12 (.714)		
Illinois Fighting Illini (Big Ten Conference) (2000–2003)
2000–01	Illinois	27–8	13–3	T–1st	NCAA Division I Elite Eight
2001–02	Illinois	26–9	11–5	T–1st	NCAA Division I Sweet Sixteen
2002–03	Illinois	25–7	11–5	2nd	NCAA Division I Round of 32
Illinois:		78–24 (.765)	35–13 (.729)		
Kansas Jayhawks (Big 12 Conference) (2003–present)
2003–04	Kansas	24–9	12–4	T–2nd	NCAA Division I Elite Eight
2004–05	Kansas	23–7	12–4	T–1st	NCAA Division I Round of 64
2005–06	Kansas	25–8	13–3	T–1st	NCAA Division I Round of 64
2006–07	Kansas	33–5	14–2	1st	NCAA Division I Elite Eight
2007–08	Kansas	37–3	13–3	T–1st	NCAA Division I Champion
2008–09	Kansas	27–8	14–2	1st	NCAA Division I Sweet Sixteen
2009–10	Kansas	33–3	15–1	1st	NCAA Division I Round of 32
2010–11	Kansas	35–3	14–2	1st	NCAA Division I Elite Eight
2011–12	Kansas	32–7	16–2	1st	NCAA Division I Runner-up
2012–13	Kansas	31–6	14–4	T–1st	NCAA Division I Sweet Sixteen
2013–14	Kansas	25–10	14–4	1st	NCAA Division I Round of 32
2014–15	Kansas	27–9	13–5	1st	NCAA Division I Round of 32
2015–16	Kansas	33–5	15–3	1st	NCAA Division I Elite Eight
2016–17	Kansas	31–5	16–2	1st	NCAA Division I Elite Eight
2017–18	Kansas	16–8*	3–5*	1st*	NCAA Division I Final Four*
2018–19	Kansas	26–10	12–6	3rd	NCAA Division I Round of 32
2019–20	Kansas	28–3	17–1	1st	Postseason cancelled due to COVID-19
2020–21	Kansas	21–9	12–6	2nd	NCAA Division I Round of 32
2021–22	Kansas	34–6	14–4	T–1st	NCAA Division I Champion
2022–23	Kansas	24–8**	13–5	1st	NCAA Division I Round of 32
2023–24	Kansas	23–11	10–8	T–5th	NCAA Division I Round of 32
2024–25	Kansas	21–13	11–9	6th	NCAA Division I Round of 64
2025–26	Kansas	24–11	12–6	T–3rd	NCAA Division I Round of 32
2026–27	Kansas	5–0	0–0		
Kansas:		638–167 (.793)*	299–91 (.767)*		
Total:		845–272 (.756)			
National champion Postseason invitational champion Conference regular season champion Conference regular season and conference tournament champion Division regular season champion Division regular season and conference tournament champion Conference tournament champion

*Does not include 15 vacated wins, 10 of which were conference wins. The Jayhawks regular season Big 12 championship and their Big 12 Tournament championship were vacated. The Jayhawks entire NCAA Tournament appearance from the season was vacated including their Final Four appearance.
**Does not include record during Self's suspension, but does include games missed due to health issues.

== Personal life ==
Self is married with two children, a daughter and a son. His daughter graduated from Kansas in 2013. His son, Tyler, played basketball at Kansas from 2012 to 2017 and was the general manager for the Austin Spurs of the NBA G League until 2022. Self is a Christian.

In June 2006, Self and his wife, Cindy, established the ASSISTS foundation, a 501(c)(3) organization to serve as a fundraising conduit for organizations that serve a variety of youth initiatives.

=== Health ===
On March 8, 2023, Self arrived at the University of Kansas Health System emergency department complaining of chest tightness. He underwent a "standard heart catheterization."

On July 24, 2025, Self was hospitalized after feeling unwell and experiencing "some concerning symptoms." He subsequently underwent a procedure to have two stents inserted and was released two days later.

On January 19, 2026, Self was taken to the hospital out of an "abundance of caution" but was feeling better that evening. However, he did not accompany the team to Boulder, Colorado as he would not be able to coach the team on January 20, 2026 against the Colorado Buffaloes.

== See also ==
- List of college men's basketball coaches with 600 wins
- List of NCAA Division I Men's Final Four appearances by coach
