= 2003 MEAC men's basketball tournament =

College men's basketball conference tournament

- Classification: Division I
- Season: 2002–03
- Teams: 11
- Site: Arthur Ashe Athletic Center; Richmond, Virginia
- Champions: South Carolina State (5th title)
- Winning coach: Cy Alexander (5th title)
- MVP: Dustin Braddick (South Carolina State)

2002–03 MEAC men's basketball standings
	Conf.				Overall
Team	W		L	PCT	W		L	PCT
South Carolina State †	15	–	3	.833	20	–	11	.645
Hampton	13	–	5	.722	19	–	11	.633
Delaware State	13	–	5	.722	15	–	12	.556
Florida A&M	11	–	7	.611	17	–	12	.586
Coppin State	11	–	7	.611	11	–	17	.393
Norfolk State	10	–	8	.556	14	–	15	.483
Howard	9	–	9	.500	13	–	17	.433
Morgan State	6	–	12	.333	7	–	22	.241
Bethune–Cookman	5	–	13	.278	8	–	22	.267
Maryland Eastern Shore	5	–	13	.278	5	–	23	.179
North Carolina A&T	1	–	17	.056	1	–	26	.037
† 2003 MEAC tournament winner Rankings from AP Poll

The 2003 Mid-Eastern Athletic Conference men's basketball tournament took place March 10–15, 2003, at the Arthur Ashe Athletic Center in Richmond, Virginia. South Carolina State defeated Hampton, 72–67 in the championship game, to capture its 5th MEAC Tournament title. The Bulldogs earned an automatic bid to the 2003 NCAA tournament as No. 16 seed in the East region. In the round of 64, South Carolina State fell to No. 1 seed Oklahoma 71–54.

== Format ==
All eleven conference members participated, with the top 5 teams receiving a bye to the quarterfinal round. After seeds 6 through 11 completed games in the first round, teams were re-seeded. The lowest remaining seed was slotted against the top seed, next lowest remaining faced the #2 seed, and third lowest remaining seed squared off against the #3 seed.

== Bracket ==
First round Tuesday-Wednesday, March 10–11
8	Morgan State	103
9	Bethune–Cookman	104
6	Norfolk State	76
11	North Carolina A&T	55
7	Howard	71
10	Maryland Eastern Shore	69

Quarterfinals; Wednesday-Thursday, March 12–13
1	South Carolina State	75
9	Bethune–Cookman	73
4	Coppin State	53
5	Florida A&M	55
6	Norfolk State	62
3	Hampton	64
2	Delaware State	65
7	Howard	68

Semifinals; Friday, March 14
1	South Carolina State	72
5	Florida A&M	66
3	Hampton	73
7	Howard	64

Final; Saturday, March 15
1	South Carolina State	72
3	Hampton	67
