= 1995–96 South Carolina State Bulldogs basketball team =

American college basketball season

1995–96 South Carolina State Bulldogs men's basketball

MEAC tournament champions MEAC Regular season champions

NCAA tournament
- Conference: Mid-Eastern Athletic Conference
- Record: 22–8 (14–2 MEAC)
- Head coach: Cy Alexander (9th season)
- Home arena: SHM Memorial Center

1995–96 MEAC men's basketball standings
| | Conf. | | | | Overall |
| Team | W | | L | PCT | W | | L | PCT |
|---|---|---|---|---|---|---|---|---|
| South Carolina State † | 14 | – | 2 | .875 | 22 | – | 8 | .733 |
| Coppin State | 14 | – | 2 | .875 | 19 | – | 10 | .655 |
| Bethune–Cookman | 8 | – | 8 | .500 | 12 | – | 15 | .444 |
| Delaware State | 8 | – | 8 | .500 | 11 | – | 17 | .393 |
| North Carolina A&T | 7 | – | 9 | .438 | 10 | – | 17 | .370 |
| Maryland Eastern Shore | 6 | – | 10 | .375 | 11 | – | 16 | .407 |
| Howard | 6 | – | 10 | .375 | 7 | – | 20 | .259 |
| Morgan State | 6 | – | 10 | .375 | 7 | – | 20 | .259 |
| Florida A&M | 3 | – | 13 | .188 | 8 | – | 19 | .296 |
| Hampton | 0 | – | 0 | – | 9 | – | 17 | .346 |
† 1996 MEAC tournament winner Rankings from AP Poll

The 1995–96 South Carolina State Bulldogs basketball team represented South Carolina State University during the 1995–96 NCAA Division I men's basketball season. The Bulldogs, led by head coach Cy Alexander, played their home games at the SHM Memorial Center and were members of the Mid-Eastern Athletic Conference. The team won the MEAC regular season and conference tournament titles, and received an automatic bid to the NCAA tournament.

As No. 15 seed in the West region, the team lost to No. 2 seed Kansas in the opening round, and finished with a record of 22–8 (14–2 MEAC).

== Roster ==
1995–96 South Carolina State Bulldogs men's basketball team
| Players | Coaches |
|---|---|
| Pos. / # / Name / Height / Weight / Year / Hometown; G / 12 / Roderick Blakney / 6 ft 1 in (1.85 m) / 180 lb (82 kg) / So / Hartsville, South Carolina | Head coach: Cy Alexander; Assistant coach(es) Legend: (C) Team captain; (S) Suspended; (I) Ineligible; (W) Walk-on; Injured; Current redshirt |

== Schedule and results ==
| Date time, TV | Rank^{#} | Opponent^{#} | Result | Record | Site (attendance) city, state |
Regular season
| Nov 27, 1995* | | at South Carolina | L 70–92 | 1–1 | Carolina Coliseum; Columbia, South Carolina |
| Dec 4, 1995* | | at No. 18 Duke | L 64–84 | 1–2 | Cameron Indoor Stadium; Durham, North Carolina |
MEAC tournament
| Feb 29, 1996* | | at Florida A&M; Quarterfinals | W 79–58 | 20–7 | Gaither Athletic Center; Tallahassee, Florida |
| Mar 1, 1996* | | vs. North Carolina A&T; Semifinals | W 69–46 | 21–7 | Gaither Athletic Center; Tallahassee, Florida |
| Mar 2, 1996* | | vs. Coppin State; Championship game | W 69–56 | 22–7 | Gaither Athletic Center; Tallahassee, Florida |
NCAA tournament
| Mar 15, 1996* | (15 W) | vs. (2 W) No. 4 Kansas; First round | L 54–92 | 22–8 | ASU Activity Center; Tempe, Arizona |
*Non-conference game. ^{#}Rankings from AP Poll. (#) Tournament seedings in parentheses. W=West. All times are in Eastern Time.
