= List of Colorado Buffaloes men's basketball seasons =

This is a list of the seasons completed by the Colorado Buffaloes men's basketball program.

== Season-by-season results ==
Statistics overview
Season	Coach	Overall	Conference	Standing	Postseason
No coach (Independent) (1901–1906)
1901–02	No coach	3–1			
1902–03	No coach	2–4			
1903–04	No coach	4–3			
1904–05	No coach	3–2			
1905–06	No coach	6–5			
No coach:		18–15			
Frank Castleman (Independent) (1906–1909)
1906–07	Frank Castleman	6–4			
1907–08	Frank Castleman	6–6			
1908–09	Frank Castleman	4–3			
Frank Castleman (Rocky Mountain Conference) (1909–1912)
1909–10	Frank Castleman	7–5	3–1	T–1st	
1910–11	Frank Castleman	4–2	2–2	2nd	
1911–12	Frank Castleman	5–2	2–2	2nd	
Frank Castleman:		32–22	7–5		
John McFadden (Rocky Mountain Conference) (1912–1914)
1912–13	John McFadden	7–4	5–1	1st	
1913–14	John McFadden	3–5	3–3	1st	
John McFadden:		10–9	8–4		
James N. Ashmore (Rocky Mountain Conference) (1914–1917)
1914–15	James N. Ashmore	4–6	3–5	3rd	
1915–16	James N. Ashmore	6–2	6–2	T–1st	
1916–17	James N. Ashmore	6–2	6–2	2nd	
James N. Ashmore:		16–10	15–9		
Melbourne C. Evans (Rocky Mountain Conference) (1917–1918)
1917–18	Melbourne C. Evans	9–2	5–1	1st	
Melbourne C. Evans:		9–2	5–1		
Enoch J. Mills (Rocky Mountain Conference) (1918–1924)
1918–19	Enoch J. Mills	8–1	7–1	1st	
1919–20	Enoch J. Mills	6–4	5–2	1st	
1920–21	Enoch J. Mills	8–0	6–0	1st	
1921–22	Enoch J. Mills	3–5	3–5	3rd	
1922–23	Enoch J. Mills	1–7	1–5	4th	
1923–24	Enoch J. Mills	4–7	3–5	4th	
Enoch J. Mills:		30–24	25–18		
Howard Beresford (Rocky Mountain Conference) (1924–1933)
1924–25	Howard Beresford	9–5	7–4	3rd	
1925–26	Howard Beresford	8–5	7–5	T–3rd	
1926–27	Howard Beresford	7–5	7–5	4th	
1927–28	Howard Beresford	5–7	5–7	T–5th	
1928–29	Howard Beresford	10–2	10–2	1st	
1929–30	Howard Beresford	11–6	11–3	1st	
1930–31	Howard Beresford	8–7	8–4	3rd	
1931–32	Howard Beresford	10–7	9–5	4th	
1932–33	Howard Beresford	8–8	7–7	T–4th	
Howard Beresford:		76–52	71–42		
Henry Iba (Rocky Mountain Conference) (1933–1934)
1933–34	Henry Iba	9–8	7–7	2nd	
Henry Iba:		9–8	7–7		
Dutch Clark (Rocky Mountain Conference) (1934–1935)
1934–35	Dutch Clark	3–9	3–9	7th	
Dutch Clark:		3–9	3–9		
Frosty Cox (Rocky Mountain Conference) (1935–1938)
1935–36	Frosty Cox	6–8	6–8	6th	
1936–37	Frosty Cox	14–6	10–2	T–1st	
1937–38	Frosty Cox	15–6	10–2	T–1st	NIT Runner-up
Frosty Cox (Mountain States Conference) (1938–1947)
1938–39	Frosty Cox	14–4	10–2	1st	
1939–40	Frosty Cox	17–4	11–1	1st	NCAA Regional Fourth Place, NIT Champion
1940–41	Frosty Cox	10–6	7–5	3rd	
1941–42	Frosty Cox	16–2	11–1	1st	NCAA Final Four
1942–43	No team				
1943–44	No team				
1944–45	Frosty Cox	13–3	9–1	2nd	
1945–46	Frosty Cox	12–6	9–3	2nd	NCAA Regional Regional Third Place
1946–47	Frosty Cox	7–11	5–7	5th	
Frosty Cox (Big Seven Conference) (1947–1950)
1947–48	Frosty Cox	7–14	4–8	T–6th	
1948–49	Frosty Cox	6–12	4–8	5th	
1949–50	Frosty Cox	14–8	6–6	4th	
Frosty Cox:		147–89	102–54		
Bebe Lee (Big Seven Conference) (1950–1956)
1950–51	Bebe Lee	4–20	2–10	7th	
1951–52	Bebe Lee	8–16	4–8	T–4th	
1952–53	Bebe Lee	10–11	3–9	7th	
1953–54	Bebe Lee	11–11	10–2	T–1st	NCAA Regional Fourth Place
1954–55	Bebe Lee	19–6	11–1	1st	NCAA Final Four
1955–56	Bebe Lee	11–10	7–5	4th	
Bebe Lee:		63–74	37–35		
Sox Walseth (Big Seven / Big Eight Conference) (1956–1976)
1956–57	Sox Walseth	14–9	5–7	T–4th	
1957–58	Sox Walseth	8–15	3–9	T–6th	
1958–59	Sox Walseth	14–10	8–6	T–3rd	
1959–60	Sox Walseth	14–10	8–6	4th	
1960–61	Sox Walseth	15–10^{[Note A]}	7–7	8th	
1961–62	Sox Walseth	19–7	13–1	1st	NCAA University Division Elite Eight
1962–63	Sox Walseth	19–7	11–3	T–1st	NCAA University Division Sweet Sixteen
1963–64	Sox Walseth	15–10	9–5	2nd	
1964–65	Sox Walseth	13–12	8–6	T–3rd	
1965–66	Sox Walseth	12–13	6–8	T–5th	
1966–67	Sox Walseth	17–8	10–4	T–2nd	
1967–68	Sox Walseth	9–16	3–11	T–7th	
1968–69	Sox Walseth	21–7	10–4	1st	NCAA University Division Sweet Sixteen
1969–70	Sox Walseth	14–12	7–7	5th	
1970–71	Sox Walseth	14–12	6–8	T–5th	
1971–72	Sox Walseth	7–19	4–10	7th	
1972–73	Sox Walseth	13–13	9–5	T–2nd	
1973–74	Sox Walseth	9–17	4–10	6th	
1974–75	Sox Walseth	7–19	4–10	T–7th	
1975–76	Sox Walseth	7–19	4–10	6th	
Sox Walseth:		261–245	0–0		
Bill Blair (Big Eight Conference) (1976–1981)
1976–77	Bill Blair	11–16	5–9	6th	
1977–78	Bill Blair	9–18	3–11	8th	
1978–79	Bill Blair	14–13	4–10	8th	
1979–80	Bill Blair	17–10	7–7	5th	
1980–81	Bill Blair	16–12	5–9	6th	
Bill Blair:		67–69	24–46		
Tom Apke (Big Eight Conference) (1981–1986)
1981–82	Tom Apke	11–16	3–11	8th	
1982–83	Tom Apke	13–15	3–11	8th	
1983–84	Tom Apke	16–13	6–8	5th	
1984–85	Tom Apke	11–17	5–9	6th	
1985–86	Tom Apke	8–20	0–14	8th	
Tom Apke:		59–81	17–53		
Tom Miller (Big Eight Conference) (1986–1990)
1986–87	Tom Miller	9–19	3–11	8th	
1987–88	Tom Miller	7–21	3–11	8th	
1988–89	Tom Miller	7–21	2–12	8th	
1989–90	Tom Miller	12–18	2–12	8th	
Tom Miller:		35–79	10–46		
Joe Harrington (Big Eight Conference) (1990–1996)
1990–91	Joe Harrington	19–14	5–9	T–6th	NIT Third Place
1991–92	Joe Harrington	13–15	4–10	8th	
1992–93	Joe Harrington	10–17	2–12	8th	
1993–94	Joe Harrington	10–17	2–12	8th	
1994–95	Joe Harrington	15–13	5–9	6th	NIT First Round
1995–96	Joe Harrington; Ricardo Patton	9–18^{[Note B]}	3–11	8th	
Joe Harrington:		72–85	18–55		
Ricardo Patton (Big 12 Conference) (1996–2007)
1996–97	Ricardo Patton	22–10	11–5	2nd	NCAA Division I Second Round
1997–98	Ricardo Patton	13–14	7–9	T–7th	
1998–99	Ricardo Patton	18–15	7–9	T–7th	NIT second round
1999–00	Ricardo Patton	18–14	7–9	7th	NIT first round
2000–01	Ricardo Patton	15–15	5–11	9th	
2001–02	Ricardo Patton	15–14	5–11	9th	
2002–03	Ricardo Patton	20–12	9–7	T–5th	NCAA Division I first round
2003–04	Ricardo Patton	18–11	10–6	4th	NIT first round
2004–05	Ricardo Patton	14–16	4–12	11th	
2005–06	Ricardo Patton	20–10	9–7	5th	NIT first round
2006–07	Ricardo Patton	7–20	3–13	12th	
Ricardo Patton:		184–160	80–107		
Jeff Bzdelik (Big 12 Conference) (2007–2010)
2007–08	Jeff Bzdelik	12–20	3–13	12th	
2008–09	Jeff Bzdelik	9–22	1–15	12th	
2009–10	Jeff Bzdelik	15–16	6–10	8th	
Jeff Bzdelik:		36–58	10–38		
Tad Boyle (Big 12 Conference) (2010–2011)
2010–11	Tad Boyle	24–14	8–8	T–5th	NIT semifinal
Tad Boyle (Pac-12 Conference) (2011–2024)
2011–12	Tad Boyle	24–12	11–7	T–5th	NCAA Division I Second Round
2012–13	Tad Boyle	21–12	10–8	5th	NCAA Division I First Round
2013–14	Tad Boyle	23–12	10–8	T–3rd	NCAA Division I First Round
2014–15	Tad Boyle	16–18	7–11	T–8th	CBI quarterfinal
2015–16	Tad Boyle	22–12	10–8	5th	NCAA Division I First Round
2016–17	Tad Boyle	19–15	8–10	7th	NIT first round
2017–18	Tad Boyle	17–15	8–10	T–8th	
2018–19	Tad Boyle	23–13	10–8	5th	NIT quarterfinal
2019–20	Tad Boyle	21–11	10–8	T–5th	NCAA Division I Canceled
2020–21	Tad Boyle	23–9	14–6	3rd	NCAA Division I First Round
2021–22	Tad Boyle	21–12	12–8	4th	NIT first round
2022–23	Tad Boyle	18–17	8–12	T–8th	NIT second round
2023–24	Tad Boyle	26–11	13–7	3rd	NCAA Division I Second Round
Tad Boyle (Big 12 Conference) (2024–present)
2024–25	Tad Boyle	14–21	3–17	16th	CBC First Round
Tad Boyle:		312–204 (.605)	142–136 (.511)		
Total:		1441–1292 (.527)			
National champion Postseason invitational champion Conference regular season champion Conference regular season and conference tournament champion Division regular season champion Division regular season and conference tournament champion Conference tournament champion

^A. On September 28, 1961, the Big Eight Conference ruled that Colorado would have to forfeit all of their conference wins since Colorado player Wilky Gilmore played in organized summer league outside of college in the summer of 1960. The ruling vacated six of Colorado's conference wins, revising the Buffaloes' conference record from 7–7 to 1–13. This caused Colorado to drop from a fifth-place conference standing to last.

^B. Joe Harrington coached the first 14 games of the season, going 5–9 and 0–3 in conference play before resigning. Ricardo Patton was named interim coach and went 7–20 and 3–13 in conference for the remainder of the season.
