= 1999–2000 South Carolina State Bulldogs basketball team =

American college basketball season

1999–2000 South Carolina State Bulldogs basketball

MEAC Regular season champions MEAC tournament champions

NCAA tournament
- Conference: Mid-Eastern Athletic Conference
- Record: 20–14 (14–5 MEAC)
- Head coach: Cy Alexander (13th season)
- Home arena: SHM Memorial Center

1999–2000 MEAC men's basketball standings
| | Conf. | | | | Overall |
| Team | W | | L | PCT | W | | L | PCT |
|---|---|---|---|---|---|---|---|---|
| South Carolina State † | 14 | – | 5 | .737 | 20 | – | 14 | .588 |
| Hampton | 13 | – | 5 | .722 | 17 | – | 12 | .586 |
| Coppin State | 13 | – | 5 | .722 | 15 | – | 15 | .500 |
| Bethune–Cookman | 12 | – | 6 | .667 | 14 | – | 15 | .483 |
| Norfolk State | 11 | – | 7 | .611 | 12 | – | 16 | .429 |
| North Carolina A&T | 11 | – | 8 | .579 | 14 | – | 15 | .483 |
| Maryland Eastern Shore | 8 | – | 10 | .444 | 12 | – | 17 | .414 |
| Florida A&M | 7 | – | 11 | .389 | 9 | – | 22 | .290 |
| Delaware State | 5 | – | 13 | .278 | 6 | – | 22 | .214 |
| Morgan State | 5 | – | 13 | .278 | 5 | – | 24 | .172 |
| Howard | 1 | – | 17 | .056 | 1 | – | 27 | .036 |
† 2000 MEAC tournament winner Rankings from AP Poll

The 1999–2000 South Carolina State Bulldogs basketball team represented South Carolina State University during the 1999–2000 NCAA Division I men's basketball season. The Bulldogs, led by head coach Cy Alexander, played their home games at the SHM Memorial Center and were members of the Mid-Eastern Athletic Conference. The team won the MEAC regular season and conference tournament titles, and received an automatic bid to the NCAA tournament.

As No. 16 seed in the South region, the team lost to Stanford in the opening round, and finished with a record of 20–14 (14–5 MEAC).

== Roster ==
1999–2000 South Carolina State Bulldogs men's basketball team
Players
Coaches

| Pos. | # | Name | Height | Weight | Year | Hometown |
|---|---|---|---|---|---|---|
| G | 5 | Mike Wiatre | 6 ft 0 in (1.83 m) | — | Sr |
| | | Willie Jones | — | — | Fr |

Head coach

- Cy Alexander

Assistant coach(es)

Legend

- (C) Team captain
- (S) Suspended
- (I) Ineligible
- (W) Walk-on
- Injured
- Current redshirt

== Schedule ==
| Date time, TV | Rank^{#} | Opponent^{#} | Result | Record | Site (attendance) city, state |
Regular season
| Nov 26, 1999* | | vs. Oregon State | L 57–92 | 0–1 | BI-LO Center; Greenville, South Carolina |
| Nov 27, 1999* | | at Furman | L 58–77 | 0–2 | BI-LO Center; Greenville, South Carolina |
| Nov 28, 1999* | | vs. Central Florida | W 71–70 | 1–2 | BI-LO Center; Greenville, South Carolina |
| Dec 4, 1999* | | Coppin State | L 53–68 | 1–3 | SHM Memorial Center; Orangeburg, South Carolina |
| Dec 7, 1999* | | at Mississippi State | L 58–88 | 1–4 | Humphrey Coliseum; Starkville, Mississippi |
| Dec 11, 1999* | | at Clemson | W 71–68 | 2–4 | Littlejohn Coliseum; Clemson, South Carolina |
| Dec 14, 1999* | | at Air Force | L 72–90 | 2–5 | Clune Arena; Colorado Springs, Colorado |
| Dec 16, 1999* | | at San Diego State | L 57–72 | 2–6 | Viejas Arena; San Diego, California |
| Dec 18, 1999* | | at BYU | L 43–76 | 2–7 | Marriott Center; Provo, Utah |
MEAC tournament
| Mar 8, 2000* | | vs. Florida A&M; Quarterfinals | W 61–51 | 18–13 | Arthur Ashe Athletic Center; Richmond, Virginia |
| Mar 10, 2000* | | vs. Bethune–Cookman; Semifinals | W 88–66 | 19–13 | Arthur Ashe Athletic Center; Richmond, Virginia |
| Mar 11, 2000* | | vs. Coppin State; Championship game | W 70–53 | 20–13 | Arthur Ashe Athletic Center; Richmond, Virginia |
NCAA tournament
| Mar 17, 2000* | (16 S) | vs. (1 S) No. 3 Stanford; First Round | L 65–84 | 20–14 | Birmingham-Jefferson Civic Center; Birmingham, Alabama |
*Non-conference game. ^{#}Rankings from AP Poll. (#) Tournament seedings in parentheses. E=East. All times are in Eastern Time.
