= 1998 MEAC men's basketball tournament =

- Classification: Division I
- Season: 1997–98
- Teams: 9
- Site: Richmond Coliseum; Richmond, Virginia
- Champions: South Carolina State (3rd title)
- Winning coach: Cy Alexander (3rd title)
- MVP: Roderick Blakney (South Carolina State)

1997–98 MEAC men's basketball standings
	Conf.				Overall
Team	W		L	PCT	W		L	PCT
Coppin State	17	–	1	.944	21	–	8	.724
South Carolina State †	16	–	2	.889	22	–	8	.733
Hampton	11	–	7	.611	14	–	12	.538
Morgan State	11	–	7	.611	12	–	16	.429
Florida A&M	8	–	10	.444	11	–	17	.393
Delaware State	7	–	11	.389	9	–	18	.333
Maryland Eastern Shore	7	–	11	.389	9	–	18	.333
North Carolina A&T	7	–	11	.389	8	–	19	.296
Howard	5	–	13	.278	8	–	20	.286
Bethune–Cookman	1	–	17	.056	1	–	26	.037
Norfolk State	0	–	0	–	6	–	21	.222
† 1998 MEAC tournament winner Rankings from AP Poll

The 1998 Mid-Eastern Athletic Conference men's basketball tournament took place March 3–7, 1998, at the Richmond Coliseum in Richmond, Virginia. South Carolina State defeated Coppin State, 66–61 in the championship game, to win its 3rd MEAC Tournament title.

The Bulldogs earned an automatic bid to the 1998 NCAA tournament as No. 15 seed in the Southeast region. In the round of 64, North Carolina A&T fell to No. 2 seed Kentucky 82–67.

== Format ==
Nine of 11 conference members participated, with the top 7 teams receiving a bye to the quarterfinal round.

== Bracket ==
First round March 3
8	Howard	79
9	Bethune–Cookman	77

Quarterfinals; March 4-5
1	Coppin State	82
8	Howard	66
4	Florida A&M	88
5	Delaware State	73
3	Morgan State	72
6	Maryland Eastern Shore	51
2	South Carolina State	64
7	North Carolina A&T	58

Semifinals; March 6
1	Coppin State	77
4	Florida A&M	65
3	Morgan State	69
2	South Carolina State	82

Final; March 7
1	Coppin State	61
2	South Carolina State	66
