= 2002–03 South Carolina State Bulldogs basketball team =

American college basketball season

2002–03 South Carolina State Bulldogs men's basketball

MEAC tournament champions

NCAA tournament
- Conference: Mid-Eastern Athletic Conference
- Record: 20–11 (15–3 MEAC)
- Head coach: Cy Alexander (16th season)
- Home arena: SHM Memorial Center

2002–03 MEAC men's basketball standings
| | Conf. | | | | Overall |
| Team | W | | L | PCT | W | | L | PCT |
|---|---|---|---|---|---|---|---|---|
| South Carolina State † | 15 | – | 3 | .833 | 20 | – | 11 | .645 |
| Hampton | 13 | – | 5 | .722 | 19 | – | 11 | .633 |
| Delaware State | 13 | – | 5 | .722 | 15 | – | 12 | .556 |
| Florida A&M | 11 | – | 7 | .611 | 17 | – | 12 | .586 |
| Coppin State | 11 | – | 7 | .611 | 11 | – | 17 | .393 |
| Norfolk State | 10 | – | 8 | .556 | 14 | – | 15 | .483 |
| Howard | 9 | – | 9 | .500 | 13 | – | 17 | .433 |
| Morgan State | 6 | – | 12 | .333 | 7 | – | 22 | .241 |
| Bethune–Cookman | 5 | – | 13 | .278 | 8 | – | 22 | .267 |
| Maryland Eastern Shore | 5 | – | 13 | .278 | 5 | – | 23 | .179 |
| North Carolina A&T | 1 | – | 17 | .056 | 1 | – | 26 | .037 |
† 2003 MEAC tournament winner Rankings from AP Poll

The 2002–03 South Carolina State Bulldogs basketball team represented South Carolina State University during the 2002–03 NCAA Division I men's basketball season. The Bulldogs, led by head coach Cy Alexander, played their home games at the SHM Memorial Center and were members of the Mid-Eastern Athletic Conference. The team won the MEAC regular season and conference tournament titles, and received an automatic bid to the NCAA tournament.

As No. 16 seed in the East region, the team lost to No. 1 seed Oklahoma in the opening round, and finished with a record of 20–11 (15–3 MEAC).

== Roster ==
2002–03 South Carolina State Bulldogs men's basketball team
Players
Coaches

| Pos. | # | Name | Height | Weight | Year | Hometown |
|---|---|---|---|---|---|---|
| G | 3 | Moses Malone Jr. | 6 ft 5 in (1.96 m) | 220 lb (100 kg) | Sr | Houston, Texas |
| F | 42 | Thurman Zimmerman | 6 ft 5 in (1.96 m) | 235 lb (107 kg) | Fr | Columbia, South Carolina |
| | | Willie Jones | — | — | Sr |

Head coach

- Cy Alexander

Assistant coach(es)

Legend

- (C) Team captain
- (S) Suspended
- (I) Ineligible
- (W) Walk-on
- Injured
- Current redshirt

== Schedule ==
| Date time, TV | Rank^{#} | Opponent^{#} | Result | Record | Site (attendance) city, state |
Regular season
| Nov 29, 2002* | | at South Carolina | L 65–82 | 0–2 | Carolina Center; Columbia, South Carolina |
| Dec 4, 2002* | | at Auburn | L 65–85 | 0–3 | Beard–Eaves–Memorial Coliseum; Auburn, Alabama |
| Dec 18, 2002* | | at Wake Forest | L 57–100 | 1–5 | Lawrence Joel Veterans Memorial Coliseum; Winston-Salem, North Carolina |
MEAC tournament
| Mar 12, 2003* | | vs. Bethune-Cookman; Quarterfinals | W 75–73 | 18–10 | Arthur Ashe Athletic Center; Richmond, Virginia |
| Mar 14, 2003* | | vs. Florida A&M; Semifinals | W 72–66 | 19–10 | Arthur Ashe Athletic Center; Richmond, Virginia |
| Mar 15, 2003* | | vs. Hampton; Championship game | W 72–67 | 20–10 | Arthur Ashe Athletic Center; Richmond, Virginia |
NCAA tournament
| Mar 20, 2003* | (16 E) | vs. (1 E) No. 3 Oklahoma; First round | L 54–71 | 20–11 | Ford Center; Oklahoma City, Oklahoma |
*Non-conference game. ^{#}Rankings from AP Poll. (#) Tournament seedings in parentheses. E=East. All times are in Eastern Time.
