= 2000 MEAC men's basketball tournament =

- Classification: Division I
- Season: 1999–00
- Teams: 11
- Site: Arthur Ashe Athletic Center; Richmond, Virginia
- Champions: South Carolina State (4th title)
- Winning coach: Cy Alexander (4th title)
- MVP: Mike Wiatre (South Carolina State)

1999–2000 MEAC men's basketball standings
| | Conf. | | | | Overall |
| Team | W | | L | PCT | W | | L | PCT |
|---|---|---|---|---|---|---|---|---|
| South Carolina State † | 14 | – | 5 | .737 | 20 | – | 14 | .588 |
| Hampton | 13 | – | 5 | .722 | 17 | – | 12 | .586 |
| Coppin State | 13 | – | 5 | .722 | 15 | – | 15 | .500 |
| Bethune–Cookman | 12 | – | 6 | .667 | 14 | – | 15 | .483 |
| Norfolk State | 11 | – | 7 | .611 | 12 | – | 16 | .429 |
| North Carolina A&T | 11 | – | 8 | .579 | 14 | – | 15 | .483 |
| Maryland Eastern Shore | 8 | – | 10 | .444 | 12 | – | 17 | .414 |
| Florida A&M | 7 | – | 11 | .389 | 9 | – | 22 | .290 |
| Delaware State | 5 | – | 13 | .278 | 6 | – | 22 | .214 |
| Morgan State | 5 | – | 13 | .278 | 5 | – | 24 | .172 |
| Howard | 1 | – | 17 | .056 | 1 | – | 27 | .036 |
† 2000 MEAC tournament winner Rankings from AP Poll

The 2000 Mid-Eastern Athletic Conference men's basketball tournament took place March 6–11, 2000, at the Arthur Ashe Athletic Center in Richmond, Virginia. South Carolina State defeated Coppin State, 70–53 in the championship game, to win its fourth MEAC Tournament title. The Bulldogs earned an automatic bid to the 2000 NCAA tournament as No. 16 seed in the South region. In the round of 64, South Carolina State fell to No. 1 seed Stanford 84–65.

== Format ==
All eleven conference members participated, with the top 5 teams receiving a bye to the quarterfinal round. After seeds 6 through 11 completed games in the first round, teams were re-seeded. The lowest remaining seed was slotted against the top seed, next lowest remaining faced the #2 seed, and third lowest remaining seed squared off against the #3 seed.

== Bracket ==
First round Tuesday-Wednesday, March 6–7
8 | Florida A&M | 69
9 | Delaware State | 66
6 | North Carolina A&T | 94
11 | Howard | 69
7 | Maryland Eastern Shore | 60
10 | Morgan State | 58

Quarterfinals; Wednesday-Thursday, March 8–9
1 | South Carolina State | 61
8 | Florida A&M | 51
4 | Bethune–Cookman | 80
5 | Norfolk State | 75
3 | Hampton | 98
6 | North Carolina A&T | 88
2 | Coppin State | 73
7 | Maryland Eastern Shore | 61

Semifinals; Friday, March 10
1 | South Carolina State | 88
4 | Bethune–Cookman | 66
3 | Hampton | 60
2 | Coppin State | 64

Final; Saturday, March 11
1 | South Carolina State | 70
2 | Coppin State | 53
