= 1989 MEAC men's basketball tournament =

- Classification: Division I
- Season: 1988–89
- Teams: 8
- Site: Campus sites
- Finals site: Greensboro Coliseum; Greensboro, North Carolina
- Champions: South Carolina State (1st title)
- Winning coach: Cy Alexander (1st title)
- MVP: Travis Williams (South Carolina State)

1988–89 MEAC men's basketball standings
| | Conf. | | | | Overall |
| Team | W | | L | PCT | W | | L | PCT |
|---|---|---|---|---|---|---|---|---|
| South Carolina State † | 14 | – | 2 | .875 | 25 | – | 8 | .758 |
| Florida A&M | 12 | – | 4 | .750 | 20 | – | 10 | .667 |
| Coppin State | 11 | – | 5 | .688 | 18 | – | 11 | .621 |
| Morgan State | 9 | – | 7 | .563 | 16 | – | 13 | .552 |
| Bethune–Cookman | 8 | – | 8 | .500 | 12 | – | 16 | .429 |
| Delaware State | 6 | – | 10 | .375 | 11 | – | 17 | .393 |
| North Carolina A&T | 6 | – | 10 | .375 | 9 | – | 18 | .333 |
| Howard | 5 | – | 11 | .313 | 9 | – | 19 | .321 |
| Maryland Eastern Shore | 1 | – | 15 | .063 | 1 | – | 26 | .037 |
† 1989 MEAC tournament winner Rankings from AP Poll

The 1989 Mid-Eastern Athletic Conference men's basketball tournament took place March 3–5, 1989, at Greensboro Coliseum in Greensboro, North Carolina. South Carolina State defeated Florida A&M, 83–79 in the championship game, to win its first MEAC Tournament title.

The Bulldogs earned an automatic bid to the 1989 NCAA tournament as #15 seed in the East region.

== Format ==
Eight of nine conference members participated, with play beginning in the quarterfinal round. Teams were seeded based on their regular season conference record.

== Bracket ==
Quarterfinals; March 3
1 | South Carolina State | 89
8 | Howard | 75
4 | Morgan State | 88
5 | Bethune–Cookman | 56
3 | Coppin State | 71
6 | North Carolina A&T | 58
2 | Florida A&M | 112
7 | Delaware State | 105

Semifinals; March 4
1 | South Carolina State | 71
4 | Morgan State | 69
3 | Coppin State | 74
2 | Florida A&M | 76

Final; March 5
1 | South Carolina State | 83
2 | Florida A&M | 79
