= 1988–89 South Carolina State Bulldogs basketball team =

American college basketball season

1988–89 South Carolina State Bulldogs men's basketball

MEAC Regular season champions MEAC tournament champions

NCAA tournament
- Conference: Mid-Eastern Athletic Conference
- Record: 25–8 (14–2 MEAC)
- Head coach: Cy Alexander (2nd season)
- Home arena: SHM Memorial Center

1988–89 MEAC men's basketball standings
	Conf.				Overall
Team	W		L	PCT	W		L	PCT
South Carolina State †	14	–	2	.875	25	–	8	.758
Florida A&M	12	–	4	.750	20	–	10	.667
Coppin State	11	–	5	.688	18	–	11	.621
Morgan State	9	–	7	.563	16	–	13	.552
Bethune–Cookman	8	–	8	.500	12	–	16	.429
Delaware State	6	–	10	.375	11	–	17	.393
North Carolina A&T	6	–	10	.375	9	–	18	.333
Howard	5	–	11	.313	9	–	19	.321
Maryland Eastern Shore	1	–	15	.063	1	–	26	.037
† 1989 MEAC tournament winner Rankings from AP Poll

The 1988–89 South Carolina State Bulldogs basketball team represented South Carolina State University during the 1988–89 NCAA Division I men's basketball season. The Bulldogs, led by head coach Cy Alexander, played their home games at the SHM Memorial Center and were members of the Mid-Eastern Athletic Conference. The team won the MEAC regular season and conference tournament titles, and received an automatic bid to the NCAA Tournament.

The team lost to Duke in the first round of the NCAA tournament, and finished with a record of 25–8 (14–2 MEAC).

== Roster ==
1988–89 South Carolina State Bulldogs men's basketball team
Players	Coaches
Pos. / # / Name / Height / Weight / Year / Hometown; F / / Travis Williams / 6 ft 6 in (1.98 m) / 205 lb (93 kg) / So / Columbia, South Carolina	Head coach: Cy Alexander; Assistant coach(es) Legend: (C) Team captain; (S) Suspended; (I) Ineligible; (W) Walk-on; Injured; Current redshirt

== Schedule ==
Date time, TV	Rank^{#}	Opponent^{#}	Result	Record	Site (attendance) city, state
Regular season
Dec 13, 1988*		at Clemson	L 70–93	4–2	Littlejohn Coliseum; Clemson, South Carolina
Dec 27, 1988*		at UTEP	L 68–91	5–3	Special Events Center; El Paso, Texas
MEAC tournament
Mar 3, 1989*		Howard; MEAC Tournament Quarterfinal	W 89–75	23–7	SHM Memorial Center; Orangeburg, South Carolina
Mar 4, 1989*		vs. Morgan State; MEAC Tournament Semifinal	W 71–69	24–7	Greensboro Coliseum; Greensboro, North Carolina
Mar 5, 1989*		vs. Florida A&M; MEAC tournament championship	W 83–79	25–7	Greensboro Coliseum; Greensboro, North Carolina
NCAA tournament
Mar 16, 1989*	(15 E)	vs. (2 E) No. 9 Duke; First Round	L 69–90	25–8	Greensboro Coliseum; Greensboro, North Carolina
*Non-conference game. ^{#}Rankings from AP Poll. (#) Tournament seedings in parentheses. E=East. All times are in Eastern Time.
