= 1996 MEAC men's basketball tournament =

- Classification: Division I
- Season: 1995–96
- Teams: 8
- Site: Leon County Civic Center; Tallahassee, Florida
- Champions: South Carolina State (2nd title)
- Winning coach: Cy Alexander (2nd title)
- MVP: Derrick Patterson (South Carolina State)

1995–96 MEAC men's basketball standings
	Conf.				Overall
Team	W		L	PCT	W		L	PCT
South Carolina State †	14	–	2	.875	22	–	8	.733
Coppin State	14	–	2	.875	19	–	10	.655
Bethune–Cookman	8	–	8	.500	12	–	15	.444
Delaware State	8	–	8	.500	11	–	17	.393
North Carolina A&T	7	–	9	.438	10	–	17	.370
Maryland Eastern Shore	6	–	10	.375	11	–	16	.407
Howard	6	–	10	.375	7	–	20	.259
Morgan State	6	–	10	.375	7	–	20	.259
Florida A&M	3	–	13	.188	8	–	19	.296
Hampton	0	–	0	–	9	–	17	.346
† 1996 MEAC tournament winner Rankings from AP Poll

The 1996 Mid-Eastern Athletic Conference men's basketball tournament took place February 29–March 2, 1996, at the Leon County Civic Center in Tallahassee, Florida. South Carolina State defeated Coppin State, 69–56 in the championship game, to win its second MEAC Tournament title.

The Bulldogs earned an automatic bid to the 1996 NCAA tournament as No. 15 seed in the West region. In the round of 64, South Carolina State fell to No. 2 seed Kansas 92–54.

== Format ==
Eight of ten conference members participated with play beginning with the quarterfinal round.

== Bracket ==
Quarterfinals; February 29
1	South Carolina State	79
8	Florida A&M	58
4	Bethune-Cookman	74
5	North Carolina A&T	75
3	Delaware State	59
6	Maryland Eastern Shore	56
2	Coppin State	83
7	Howard	63

Semifinals; March 1
1	South Carolina State	69
5	North Carolina A&T	46
3	Delaware State	64
2	Coppin State	78

Championship game March 2
1	South Carolina State	69
2	Coppin State	56

* denotes overtime period
