= 2002–03 Kansas Jayhawks men's basketball team =

American college basketball season

2002–03 Kansas Jayhawks men's basketball

NCAA tournament, Runner-up Big 12 regular season champions

National Championship Game, L 78–81 vs. Syracuse
- Conference: Big 12 Conference
- North

Ranking
- Coaches: No. 2
- AP: No. 6
- Record: 30–8 (14–2 Big 12)
- Head coach: Roy Williams (15th season)
- Assistant coaches: Jerod Haase (4th season); Joe Holladay (9th season); Ben Miller (3rd season); Steve Robinson (8th season)
- Captains: Nick Collison; Kirk Hinrich
- Home arena: Allen Fieldhouse

2002–03 Big 12 men's basketball standings
	Conf.				Overall
Team	W		L	PCT	W		L	PCT
No. 6 Kansas	14	–	2	.875	30	–	8	.789
No. 5 Texas	13	–	3	.813	26	–	7	.788
No. 3 Oklahoma †	12	–	4	.750	27	–	7	.794
Oklahoma State	10	–	6	.625	22	–	10	.688
No. 24 Missouri	9	–	7	.563	22	–	11	.667
Colorado	9	–	7	.563	20	–	12	.625
Texas Tech	6	–	10	.375	22	–	13	.629
Texas A&M	6	–	10	.375	14	–	14	.500
Iowa State	5	–	11	.313	17	–	14	.548
Baylor	5	–	11	.313	14	–	14	.500
Kansas State	4	–	12	.250	13	–	17	.433
Nebraska	3	–	13	.188	11	–	19	.367
† 2003 Big 12 Tournament winner Rankings from AP poll

The 2002–03 Kansas Jayhawks men's basketball team represented the University of Kansas in the 2002–03 NCAA Division I men's basketball season, which was the Jayhawks' 105th basketball season and the 15th and final season under head coach Roy Williams. The team played its home games in Allen Fieldhouse in Lawrence, Kansas.

== Recruiting ==
College recruiting information
Name	Hometown	School	Height	Weight	Commit date
Jeff Graves; PF	Lees Summit, Missouri	Iowa Western Community College (IA)	6 ft 9 in (2.06 m)	256 lb (116 kg)	Jul 8, 2002
Jeff Graves; PF	Recruit ratings: Scout: Rivals:				
Moulaye Niang; C	El Cajon, California	Christian High School San Diego (CA)	6 ft 10 in (2.08 m)	213 lb (97 kg)	Oct 15, 2001
Moulaye Niang; C	Recruit ratings: Scout: Rivals:				

== Roster ==
Name	#	Position	Height	Weight	Year	Home Town
Nick Collison	4	Forward	6–9	255	Senior	Iowa Falls, Iowa
Jeff Graves	42	Forward	6–9	255	Junior	Lee's Summit, Missouri
Jeff Hawkins	1	Guard	5–11	175	Freshman	Kansas City, Kansas
Kirk Hinrich	10	Guard	6–3	190	Senior	Sioux City, Iowa
Keith Langford	5	Guard	6–4	205	Sophomore	Fort Worth, Texas
Michael Lee	25	Guard	6–3	215	Sophomore	Portland, Oregon
Aaron Miles	11	Guard	6–1	175	Sophomore	Portland, Oregon
Christian Moody	34	Forward	6–7	205	Freshman	Asheville, North Carolina
Bryant Nash	33	Forward	6–6	205	Junior	Carrollton, Texas
Moulaye Niang	55	Forward	6–10	215	Freshman	El Cajon, California
Brett Olson	3	Forward	6–7	220	Junior	Chanute, Kansas
Wayne Simien	23	Forward	6–9	255	Sophomore	Leavenworth, Kansas
Stephen Vinson	20	Guard	6–2	185	Freshman	Lawrence, Kansas

== Schedule ==
Date time, TV	Rank^{#}	Opponent^{#}	Result	Record	Site (attendance) city, state
Exhibition
11/4/2002*	No. 2	EA Sports All-Stars	W 111–94		Allen Fieldhouse (16,000); Lawrence, KS
11/12/2002*	No. 2	Washburn	W 101–66		Allen Fieldhouse (16,150); Lawrence, KS
Regular season
11/19/2002*; 8:00PM, ESPN	No. 2	Holy Cross; Preseason NIT first round	W 81–57	1–0	Allen Fieldhouse (16,300); Lawrence, KS
11/22/2002*; 6:00PM, ESPN2	No. 2	UNC Greensboro; Preseason NIT Second round	W 105–66	2–0	Allen Fieldhouse (16,300); Lawrence, KS
11/27/2002*; 8:00PM, ESPN	No. 2	vs. North Carolina; Preseason NIT Semifinals	L 56–67	2–1	Madison Square Garden (10,758); New York, NY
11/29/2002*; 5:30PM, ESPN	No. 2	vs. No. 7 Florida; Preseason NIT Third-place game	L 73–83	2–2	Madison Square Garden (10,758); New York, NY
12/4/2002*; 7:00PM, Jayhawk-TV	No. 14	Central Missouri State	W 97–70	3–2	Allen Fieldhouse (16,300); Lawrence, KS
12/7/2002*; 2:30PM, CBS	No. 14	at No. 7 Oregon	L 78–84	3–3	Rose Garden (20,762); Portland, OR
12/11/2002*; 7:05PM, Jayhawk-TV	No. 20	at No. 17 Tulsa	W 89–80	4–3	Donald Reynolds Center (8,355); Tulsa, OK
12/14/2002*; 7:00PM, Jayhawk-TV	No. 20	Emporia State	W 113–61	5–3	Allen Fieldhouse (16,300); Lawrence, KS
12/21/2002*; 4:00PM, CBS	No. 19	UCLA	W 87–70	6–3	Allen Fieldhouse (16,300); Lawrence, KS
12/28/2002*; 2:30PM, ABC	No. 19	at California; Pete Newell Challenge	W 80–67	7–3	Oakland Arena (14,170); Oakland, CA
1/2/2003*; 7:00PM, Jayhawk-TV	No. 18	UNC Asheville	W 102–50	8–3	Allen Fieldhouse (16,300); Lawrence, KS
1/4/2003*; 2:00PM, Jayhawk-TV	No. 18	vs. UMKC; Feist Shootout	W 100–46	9–3	Kemper Arena (13,433); Kansas City, MO
1/6/2003; 8:00PM, ESPN	No. 14	at Iowa State	W 83–54	10–3 (1–0)	James H. Hilton Coliseum (12,084); Ames, IA
1/11/2003; 12:45PM, Big 12 (ESPN+)	No. 14	Nebraska	W 92–59	11–3 (2–0)	Allen Fieldhouse (16,300); Lawrence, KS
1/15/2003*; 8:00PM, ESPN2	No. 12	Wyoming	W 98–70	12–3	Allen Fieldhouse (16,300); Lawrence, KS
1/18/2003; 7:00PM, Big 12 (ESPN+)	No. 12	Kansas State; Sunflower Showdown	W 81–64	13–3 (3–0)	Allen Fieldhouse (16,300); Lawrence, KS
1/22/2003; 8:00PM, Big 12 (ESPN+)	No. 6	at Colorado	L 59–60	13–4 (3–1)	Coors Events Center (11,076); Boulder, CO
1/25/2003*; 12:00PM, CBS	No. 6	No. 1 Arizona	L 74–91	13–5	Allen Fieldhouse (16,300); Lawrence, KS
1/27/2003; 8:00PM, ESPN	No. 12	No. 3 Texas	W 90–87	14–5 (4–1)	Allen Fieldhouse (16,300); Lawrence, KS
2/1/2003; 1:00PM, ESPN	No. 12	at Nebraska	W 81–51	15–5 (5–1)	Bob Devaney Sports Center (13,054); Lincoln, NE
2/3/2003; 8:00PM, ESPN	No. 12	No. 21 Missouri; Border War	W 76–70	16–5 (6–1)	Allen Fieldhouse (16,300); Lawrence, KS
2/8/2003; 12:45PM, Big 12 (ESPN+)	No. 12	at Kansas State; Sunflower Showdown	W 82–64	17–5 (7–1)	Bramlage Coliseum (13,340); Manhattan, KS
2/11/2003; 8:00PM, Big 12 (ESPN+)	No. 9	at Baylor	W 79–58	18–5 (8–1)	Ferrell Center (8,758); Waco, TX
2/16/2003; 12:00PM, Big 12 (ESPN+)	No. 9	Iowa State	W 70–51	19–5 (9–1)	Allen Fieldhouse (16,300); Lawrence, KS
2/19/2003; 6:30PM, Big 12 (ESPN+)	No. 6	Colorado	W 94–87	20–5 (10–1)	Allen Fieldhouse (16,300); Lawrence, KS
2/23/2003; 3:00PM, CBS	No. 6	at No. 5 Oklahoma	L 70–77	20–6 (10–2)	Lloyd Noble Center (12,543); Norman, OK
2/26/2003; 6:30PM, Big 12 (ESPN+)	No. 7	Texas A&M	W 85–45	21–6 (11–2)	Allen Fieldhouse (16,300); Lawrence, KS
3/1/2003; 12:00PM, ABC	No. 7	No. 16 Oklahoma State	W 79–61	22–6 (12–2)	Allen Fieldhouse (16,300); Lawrence, KS
3/3/2003; 8:00PM, ESPN	No. 6	at Texas Tech	W 65–56	23–6 (13–2)	United Spirit Arena (12,821); Lubbock, TX
3/9/2003; 1:00PM, CBS	No. 6	at Missouri; Border War	W 79–74	24–6 (14–2)	Hearnes Center (13,611); Columbia, MO
Big 12 Tournament
3/14/2003; 12:00PM, Big 12 (ESPN+)	(1) No. 4	vs. (9) Iowa State quarterfinals	W 89–74	25–6	American Airlines Center (16,200); Dallas, TX
3/15/2003; 1:00PM, Big 12 (ESPN+)	(1) No. 4	vs. (4) Missouri semifinals	L 63–68	25–7	American Airlines Center (19,100); Dallas, TX
NCAA tournament
3/20/2003*; 8:30PM, CBS	(2 W) No. 6	vs. (15 W) Utah State; First round	W 64–61	26–7	Ford Center (18,462); Oklahoma City, OK
3/22/2003*; 6:50PM, CBS	(2 W) No. 6	vs. (10 W) Arizona State; Second round	W 108–76	27–7	Ford Center (18,462); Oklahoma City, OK
3/27/2003*; 8:50PM, CBS	(2 W) No. 6	vs. (3 W) No. 7 Duke; Sweet Sixteen	W 69–65	28–7	Arrowhead Pond of Anaheim (17,607); Anaheim, CA
3/29/2003*; 6:05PM, CBS	(2 W) No. 6	vs. (1 W) No. 2 Arizona; Elite Eight	W 78–75	29–7	Arrowhead Pond of Anaheim (17,439); Anaheim, CA
4/5/2003*; 5:07PM, CBS	(2 W) No. 6	vs. (3 MW) No. 9 Marquette; Final Four	W 94–61	30–7	Louisiana Superdome (54,432); New Orleans, LA
4/7/2003*; 8:18PM, CBS	(2 W) No. 6	vs. (3 E) No. 13 Syracuse; National Championship game	L 78–81	30–8	Louisiana Superdome (54,524); New Orleans, LA
*Non-conference game. ^{#}Rankings from AP Poll. (#) Tournament seedings in parentheses. All times are in Central Standard Time.

== Rankings ==
Poll	Pre	Wk 1	Wk 2	Wk 3	Wk 4	Wk 5	Wk 6	Wk 7	Wk 8	Wk 9	Wk 10	Wk 11	Wk 12	Wk 13	Wk 14	Wk 15	Wk 16	Wk 17	Wk 18
AP	2	2	2	14	20	19	19	18	14	12	6	12	12	9	6	7	6	4	6
Coaches	2	*NP	2	13	19	18	19	17	14	12	6	13	11	10	6	7	6	4	2

*There was no coaches poll in week 1.

== See also ==
- 2003 NCAA Division I men's basketball tournament
- 2003 Big 12 men's basketball tournament
- 2002-03 NCAA Division I men's basketball season
- 2002–03 NCAA Division I men's basketball rankings
