= 1997–98 South Carolina State Bulldogs basketball team =

American college basketball season

1997–98 South Carolina State Bulldogs men's basketball

MEAC tournament champions

NCAA tournament
- Conference: Mid-Eastern Athletic Conference
- Record: 22–8 (16–2 MEAC)
- Head coach: Cy Alexander (11th season)
- Home arena: SHM Memorial Center

1997–98 MEAC men's basketball standings
	Conf.				Overall
Team	W		L	PCT	W		L	PCT
Coppin State	17	–	1	.944	21	–	8	.724
South Carolina State †	16	–	2	.889	22	–	8	.733
Hampton	11	–	7	.611	14	–	12	.538
Morgan State	11	–	7	.611	12	–	16	.429
Florida A&M	8	–	10	.444	11	–	17	.393
Delaware State	7	–	11	.389	9	–	18	.333
Maryland Eastern Shore	7	–	11	.389	9	–	18	.333
North Carolina A&T	7	–	11	.389	8	–	19	.296
Howard	5	–	13	.278	8	–	20	.286
Bethune–Cookman	1	–	17	.056	1	–	26	.037
Norfolk State	0	–	0	–	6	–	21	.222
† 1998 MEAC tournament winner Rankings from AP Poll

The 1997–98 South Carolina State Bulldogs basketball team represented South Carolina State University during the 1997–98 NCAA Division I men's basketball season. The Bulldogs, led by head coach Cy Alexander, played their home games at the SHM Memorial Center and were members of the Mid-Eastern Athletic Conference. The team won the conference tournament title, defeating regular season champion Coppin State, and received an automatic bid to the NCAA tournament.

As the No. 15 seed in the Southeast region, S.C. State lost to No. 2 seed and eventual National champion Kentucky in the opening round, and finished with a record of 22–8 (16–2 MEAC).

== Roster ==
1997–98 South Carolina State Bulldogs men's basketball team
Players	Coaches
Pos. / # / Name / Height / Weight / Year / Hometown; G / 12 / Roderick Blakney / 6 ft 1 in (1.85 m) / 180 lb (82 kg) / Sr / Hartsville, South Carolina	Head coach: Cy Alexander; Assistant coach(es) Legend: (C) Team captain; (S) Suspended; (I) Ineligible; (W) Walk-on; Injured; Current redshirt

== Schedule ==
Date time, TV	Rank^{#}	Opponent^{#}	Result	Record	Site (attendance) city, state
Regular season
Dec 1, 1997*		at No. 1 Duke	L 40–98	0–2	Cameron Indoor Stadium; Durham, North Carolina
Dec 20, 1997*		at NC State	L 67–68	1–3	Reynolds Coliseum; Raleigh, North Carolina
Dec 23, 1997*		at No. 10 South Carolina	L 85–90	1–4	Carolina Coliseum; Columbia, South Carolina
Dec 28, 1997*		at No. 21 Clemson	L 60–84	1–5	Littlejohn Coliseum; Clemson, South Carolina
MEAC tournament
Mar 4, 1998*		vs. North Carolina A&T; Quarterfinals	W 64–58	20–7	Richmond Coliseum; Richmond, Virginia
Mar 6, 1998*		vs. Morgan State; Semifinals	W 82–69	21–7	Richmond Coliseum; Richmond, Virginia
Mar 7, 1998*		vs. Coppin State; Championship game	W 66–61	22–7	Richmond Coliseum; Richmond, Virginia
NCAA tournament
Mar 13, 1998*	(15 SE)	vs. (2 SE) No. 5 Kentucky; First round	L 67–82	22–8	Georgia Dome; Atlanta, Georgia
*Non-conference game. ^{#}Rankings from AP Poll. (#) Tournament seedings in parentheses. SE=Southeast. All times are in Eastern Time.
