= Homenetmen Lebanon =

Lebanese-Armenian multi-sports club

- Full name: Homenetmen Sports Association Lebanon
- Founded: 1924; 102 years ago
- Based in: Beirut, Lebanon
- Colors: Orange and blue

Homenetmen Sports Association Lebanon (Arabic: الجمعية الرياضية هومنتمن لبنان; Armenian: Հայ Մարմնակրթական Ընդհանուր Միութիւն (ՀՄԸՄ), lit. 'Armenian General Athletic Union (HMƏM)') is a Lebanese-Armenian multi-sports club and scouting movement. Established in 1924, it is part of the worldwide pan-Armenian Homenetmen organization.

Homenetmen Lebanon has had teams in various national leagues, most notably in association football, basketball, track and field, table tennis, and cycling, among others.

== History ==
Lebanon's branch of the Homenetmen organisation was founded in 1924 in Beirut. They first established a football team, who first won the Lebanese Premier League in the 1943–44 season. Homenetmen was closely affiliated with the Tashnag party. Homenetmen Beirut were one of the most prominent football teams, winning the league title seven times.

Following the Lebanese Civil War, the club fell into dismay; they were relegated to the Lebanese Second Division for the first time in 2002, and to the Lebanese Third Division in 2005. Ever since, the organisation shifted its focus away from football to indoor sports.

== Branches ==
The organisation has eight branches in different locations in Lebanon: Beirut, Tripoli, Jounieh, Bourj Hammoud, Anjar, Zahlé, and Jdeideh.

- Homenetmen Antelias
- Homenetmen Beirut
  - Football
  - Basketball
- Homenetmen Bourj Hammoud
