= 2002–03 Missouri Tigers men's basketball team =

American college basketball season

2002–03 Missouri Tigers men's basketball

NCAA tournament, second round
- Conference: Big 12 Conference

Ranking
- Coaches: No. 22
- AP: No. 24
- Record: 22–11 (9–7 Big 12)
- Head coach: Quin Snyder (4th season)
- Assistant coaches: Tony Harvey (4th season); Lane Odom (3rd season); Marcus Perez (3rd season)
- Home arena: Hearnes Center

2002–03 Big 12 men's basketball standings
	Conf.				Overall
Team	W		L	PCT	W		L	PCT
No. 6 Kansas	14	–	2	.875	30	–	8	.789
No. 5 Texas	13	–	3	.813	26	–	7	.788
No. 3 Oklahoma †	12	–	4	.750	27	–	7	.794
Oklahoma State	10	–	6	.625	22	–	10	.688
No. 24 Missouri	9	–	7	.563	22	–	11	.667
Colorado	9	–	7	.563	20	–	12	.625
Texas Tech	6	–	10	.375	22	–	13	.629
Texas A&M	6	–	10	.375	14	–	14	.500
Iowa State	5	–	11	.313	17	–	14	.548
Baylor	5	–	11	.313	14	–	14	.500
Kansas State	4	–	12	.250	13	–	17	.433
Nebraska	3	–	13	.188	11	–	19	.367
† 2003 Big 12 Tournament winner Rankings from AP poll

The 2002–03 Missouri Tigers men's basketball team represented the University of Missouri as a member of the Big 12 Conference during the 2001–02 NCAA men's basketball season. Led by fourth-year head coach Quin Snyder, the Tigers reached the second round of the NCAA tournament, and finished with an overall record of 22–11 (9–7 Big 12).

== Roster ==
2002–03 Missouri Tigers men's basketball team
Players
Coaches

Pos.	#	Name	Height	Weight	Year	Hometown
G	0	Ricky Clemons	5 ft 11 in (1.8 m)	172 lb (78 kg)	Jr	Raleigh, North Carolina
G	1	Jimmy McKinney	6 ft 3 in (1.91 m)	212 lb (96 kg)	Fr	St. Louis, Missouri
F	5	Travon Bryant	6 ft 9 in (2.06 m)	245 lb (111 kg)	Jr	Long Beach, California
G	10	Ryan Kiernan	6 ft 0 in (1.83 m)	195 lb (88 kg)	Sr	St. Charles, Missouri
F	14	Kevin Young	6 ft 9 in (2.06 m)	270 lb (122 kg)	Fr
F	15	Josh Kroenke	6 ft 4 in (1.93 m)	200 lb (91 kg)	Jr	Columbia, Missouri
G	23	Rickey Paulding	6 ft 5 in (1.96 m)	210 lb (95 kg)	Jr	Detroit, Michigan
G	24	Jake Jackson	6 ft 2 in (1.88 m)	191 lb (87 kg)	Sr	DeSoto, Missouri
G/F	33	Najeeb Echols	6 ft 7 in (2.01 m)	235 lb (107 kg)	So	Chicago, Illinois
F	50	Arthur Johnson	6 ft 9 in (2.06 m)	270 lb (122 kg)	Jr	Detroit, Michigan
C	55	Jeffrey Ferguson	6 ft 10 in (2.08 m)	230 lb (104 kg)	So	Benton Harbor, Michigan

Head coach

- Quin Snyder (Duke)

Assistant coach(es)

- Tony Harvey (Cameron)
- Lane Odom (High Point)
- Marcus Perez (Army)

Legend

- (C) Team captain
- (S) Suspended
- (I) Ineligible
- (W) Walk-on
- Injured
- Current redshirt

== Schedule and results ==
Date time, TV	Rank^{#}	Opponent^{#}	Result	Record	Site (attendance) city, state
Regular season
Nov 22, 2002*	No. 20	American	W 72–57	1–0	Hearnes Center; Columbia, Missouri
Nov 30, 2002*	No. 18	Austin Peay	W 81–46	2–0	Hearnes Center; Columbia, Missouri
Dec 2, 2002*	No. 15	Sacramento State	W 98–60	3–0	Hearnes Center; Columbia, Missouri
Dec 7, 2002*	No. 15	vs. USC	W 78–72	4–0	Honda Center
Dec 9, 2002*	No. 11	Green Bay	W 88–67	5–0	Hearnes Center; Columbia, Missouri
Dec 14, 2002*	No. 11	Memphis	W 93–78	6–0	Hearnes Center; Columbia, Missouri
Dec 21, 2002*	No. 11	vs. No. 12 Illinois; Braggin' Rights	L 70–85	6–1	Scottrade Center (22,153); St. Louis, Missouri
Dec 30, 2002*	No. 16	Valparaiso	W 65–47	7–1	Hearnes Center; Columbia, Missouri
Jan 4, 2003*	No. 16	at Iowa	W 88–82	8–1	Carver-Hawkeye Arena; Iowa City, Iowa
Jan 7, 2003*	No. 13	Centenary	W 88–58	9–1	Hearnes Center; Columbia, Missouri
Jan 11, 2003	No. 13	Baylor	W 77–69	10–1 (1–0)	Hearnes Center; Columbia, Missouri
Jan 13, 2003*	No. 11	at No. 25 Syracuse	L 69–76	10–2	Carrier Dome; Syracuse, New York
Jan 18, 2003	No. 11	at No. 24 Oklahoma State	L 56–76	10–3 (1–1)	Gallagher-Iba Arena; Stillwater, Oklahoma
Jan 21, 2003	No. 21	Iowa State	W 64–59	11–3 (2–1)	Hearnes Center; Columbia, Missouri
Jan 25, 2003	No. 21	at No. 4 Texas	L 55–76	11–4 (2–2)	Frank Erwin Center; Austin, Texas
Jan 29, 2003	No. 25	at Nebraska	W 63–56	12–4 (3–2)	Bob Devaney Sports Center; Lincoln, Nebraska
Feb 1, 2003	No. 25	Colorado	W 73–70	13–4 (4–2)	Hearnes Center; Columbia, Missouri
Feb 3, 2003	No. 21	at No. 12 Kansas; Border War	L 70–76	13–5 (4–3)	Allen Fieldhouse; Lawrence, Kansas
Feb 9, 2003	No. 21	Texas Tech	W 82–73	14–5 (5–3)	Hearnes Center; Columbia, Missouri
Feb 12, 2003	No. 21	at Texas A&M	L 71–73	14–6 (5–4)	Reed Arena; College Station, Texas
Feb 15, 2003	No. 21	Kansas State	W 71–63	15–6 (6–4)	Hearnes Center; Columbia, Missouri
Feb 18, 2003		Nebraska	W 67–50	16–6 (7–4)	Hearnes Center; Columbia, Missouri
Feb 22, 2003		at Colorado	L 68–89	16–7 (7–5)	Coors Events/Conference Center; Boulder, Colorado
Feb 26, 2003		No. 3 Oklahoma	W 67–52	17–7 (8–5)	Hearnes Center; Columbia, Missouri
Mar 1, 2003		at Kansas State	W 77–70	18–7 (9–5)	Bramlage Coliseum; Manhattan, Kansas
Mar 5, 2003		at Iowa State	L 55–71	18–8 (9–6)	Hilton Coliseum; Ames, Iowa
Mar 9, 2003		No. 6 Kansas	L 74–79	18–9 (9–7)	Hearnes Center; Columbia, Missouri
Big 12 Conference tournament
Mar 13, 2003*		vs. Nebraska; First Round	W 70–61	19–9	American Airlines Center; Dallas, Texas
Mar 14, 2003*		vs. No. 23 Oklahoma State; Quarterfinals	W 60–58	20–9	American Airlines Center; Dallas, Texas
Mar 15, 2003*		vs. No. 4 Kansas; Semifinals	W 68–63	21–9	American Airlines Center; Dallas, Texas
Mar 16, 2003*		vs. No. 6 Oklahoma; Championship Game	L 47–49	21–10	American Airlines Center; Dallas, Texas
NCAA tournament
Mar 20, 2003*	(6 MW) No. 24	vs. (11 MW) Southern Illinois; First Round	W 72–71	22–10	RCA Dome; Indianapolis, Indiana
Mar 22, 2003*	(6 MW) No. 24	vs. (3 MW) No. 9 Marquette; Second Round	L 92–101 ^{OT}	22–11	RCA Dome; Indianapolis, Indiana
*Non-conference game. ^{#}Rankings from AP. (#) Tournament seedings in parentheses. MW=Midwest. All times are in Central.
