= Homenetmen Beirut (basketball) =

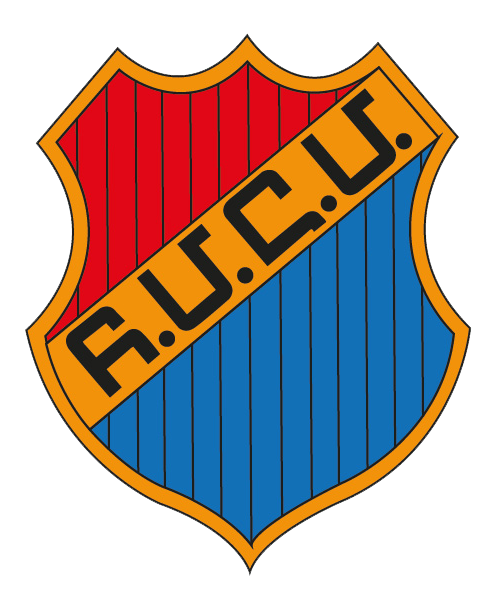
- Nickname: Orange Hell
- League: Lebanese Basketball League
- Founded: 1910
- History: Homenetmen Beirut; 1918–present
- Arena: Adom & Sella Tenjukian stadium
- Capacity: 1000
- Location: Mezher, Lebanon
- Team colors: Orange, Black, Army Navy
- Head coach: Ricky Cleveland
- Team captain: Gabriel Ajemian
- Championships: 1 Arab Club Basketball Championship; 1 Lebanese Basketball League; 1 Lebanese Basketball Cup
| Home | Away | Third |

Homenetmen Beirut (Arabic: نادي الهومنتمن; Armenian: Հայ Մարմնակրթական Ընդհանուր Միութիւն (ՀՄԸՄ), lit. 'Armenian General Athletic Union and Scouts'), or simply Homenetmen, is the basketball department of Homenetmen, a Lebanese-Armenian multi-sports club based in Beirut, Lebanon. The club was established in 1924 in Beirut and is part of the worldwide pan-Armenian Homenetmen association. Homenetmen Beirut won its first Lebanese League Championship in 2018.

Among the well-known players that have played with the club over the years are: Justin Gray, Dion Dixon, Joe Vogel, Rashad McCants, Fadi El Khatib, Ahmad Ibrahim, Ismail Ahmad, Sam Young, Bassem Balaa, Michael Fraser, Kevin Galloway, DeWayne Jackson, Ater Majok, Norvel Pelle, Nadim Souaid, Sam Thompson, Justin Tubbs, Mike Taylor, Nate Robinson, Chris Johnson and Walter Hodge.

== History ==
=== 2003–2013: Second Division years ===
In 2003, Homenetmen was relegated from the Lebanese Basketball first division. The club played for the first time in history in the Lebanese basketball’s second division. After playing for one season in the second division the club qualified back to the first division in 2004 but was unable to play due to financial crisis. For years, the club fought for a place in the play-offs of the second division but ended up getting knocked out. In 2012, Homenetmen reached the playoff semifinals but lost the series.

=== Back to First Division ===
Homenetmen ended a 10-year wait for top-flight promotion to the Lebanese basketball’s first division.

2013–2014

The season started poorly with just 2 wins out of 6 games. The club finished the regular season 6th and faced Amchit in the playoffs. The series ended 3–0 for Amchit.

Before the start of the 2014–2015 season and due to problems with the Basketball Committee and with the President Guy Manoukian, Homenetmen’s Central Committee formed a new Basketball committee. Homenetmen finished the regular season 7th and faced Sagesse in the playoffs. Sagesse won the series 3–1.

2014–2015

The 2014–2015 season was horrible to the Homenetmen family because of the poor results. The Homenetmen Central Committee dissolved the newly assigned Basketball Committee and reassigned the former Basketball Committee.

2015–2016 Homenetmen qualified for the semi-finals for the first time in the history of LBL, but got knocked out of semi-finals by Al Riyadi Club 2–4. Homenetmen played the Lebanese Cup that year and was knocked out after losing in the semifinals against Tadamon Zouk

2016–2017 Homenetmen finished the season top of the league with 17 wins and 1 loss and routing the second round with 6 wins. In the Finals Homenetmen faced Al Riyadi and were defeated 2–4.

2017–2018

Homenetmen won the Lebanese Cup by beating Al Riyadi 77–70.

== Arena ==
Homenetmen's long-time home court is the Tenjoukian arena in Mzher, Antelias. The construction of the venue was completed in 2000. The seating capacity is around 1000, however the arena can hold up to a capacity of more than 1200+ when standing.

== Squad ==
Note: Flags indicate national team eligibility at FIBA-sanctioned events. Players may hold other non-FIBA nationalities not displayed.

Homenetmen Beirut B.C. roster
Players
Coaches

| Pos. | No. | Nat. | Name | Ht. | Age |
|---|---|---|---|---|---|
| G | 2 | (Lebanon) | Younes, Omar | 1.93 m (6 ft 4 in) | 20 – 1 January 2006 |
| G | 3 | (United States) | Collins, Chauncey | 1.85 m (6 ft 1 in) | 31 – 17 January 1995 |
| SF | 4 | (Lebanon) | Khoury, Joseph | 2.01 m (6 ft 7 in) | 28 – 22 February 1998 |
| F | 5 | (United States Virgin Islands) (United States) | James, Mervin | 2.01 m (6 ft 7 in) | 26 – 27 October 2000 |
| G/F | 6 | (Lebanon) | Oueidat, Karim | 1.95 m (6 ft 5 in) | 20 – 4 April 2006 |
| G | 7 | (Lebanon) | Zaloum, Karl | 1.82 m (6 ft 0 in) | 35 – 1 December 1990 |
| G | 8 | (Lebanon) | Birejiklian, Kevin | 1.92 m (6 ft 4 in) | 20 – 4 May 2006 |
| F/C | 10 | (France) (Mali) | Kone, Sidiki | 2.11 m (6 ft 11 in) | 25 – 21 January 2001 |
| SF | 11 | (Lebanon) (Armenia) | Jouljian, Raphael | 1.98 m (6 ft 6 in) | 20 – 6 August 2006 |
| G/F | 23 | (Lebanon) (Mexico) | Nader, Dimitri | 1.93 m (6 ft 4 in) | 23 – 21 February 2003 |
| PG | 24 | (Lebanon) (Armenia) | Keosheian, Varak | 1.78 m (5 ft 10 in) | 29 – 16 April 1997 |
| G | 32 | (Lebanon) (Armenia) | Dekermenjian, Peter | 1.95 m (6 ft 5 in) | 23 – 1 January 2003 |
| PF | 33 | (Lebanon) | Nakhle, Jimmy | 2.01 m (6 ft 7 in) | 26 – 2 February 2000 |

Head coach

- (United States) Ricky Cleveland

Assistant coach(es)

- (Lebanon) Joe Moujaes
- (Lebanon) Michael Mikaelian

Physiotherapist(s)

- (Lebanon) Razmig Beujekian

Legend

- (C) Team captain
- Injured

- Roster
Updated: 2026 October 20

=== Depth chart ===
| Pos. | Starting 5 | Bench 1 | Bench 2 |
|---|---|---|---|
| C | Sidiki Kone | Jimmy Nakhle |
| PF | Mervin James | Joseph Khoury | Dimitri Nader |
| SF | | Raphael Jouljian | Omar Younes |
| SG | Peter Dekermenjian | Karim Oueidat | Kevin Birejiklian |
| PG | Chauncey Collins | Karl Zaloum | Varak Keosheian |

== Achievements ==
- Lebanese Basketball League (1):

2017-2018

- Lebanese Cup Winner (1):

2018

- Lebanese Basketball Second Division 2 (2):

2003-2004, 2012-2013

- Houssam Edin El Hariri Tournament (1):

2016

- Henri Chalhoub Tournament (1):

2017

- Syrian Basketball Super Cup

Quarterfinals: 2022

- Arab Club Championship (1):

2017

== Women's Basketball Program ==
The Homenetmen Antelias are a professional basketball team based in Antelias, playing in the Women's Lebanese Basketball League (WLBL). They compete in the first division.

== See also ==
- Homenetmen Lebanon
  - Homenetmen Beirut F.C.
  - Homenetmen Antelias
  - Homenetmen Bourj Hammoud
