= DeWayne Jackson =

American basketball player (born 1990)

No. 0 – Al-Ahli Manama
- Position: Forward
- League: Bahraini Premier League

Personal information
- Born: November 30, 1990 (age 34) Washington, D.C., U.S.
- Listed height: 6 ft 8 in (2.03 m)
- Listed weight: 209 lb (95 kg)

Career information
- High school: Bowie (Bowie, Maryland)
- College: Morgan State (2009–2013)
- NBA draft: 2013: undrafted
- Playing career: 2014–present

Career history
- 2014–2015: Beroe
- 2015–2017: Homenetmen Beirut
- 2017–2018: Sagesse
- 2018–2019: Champville SC
- 2019: Homenetmen Beirut
- 2020: KB Prishtina
- 2020: Sharjah SC
- 2020–2021: Al Ahli Tripoli
- 2021–2022: Al-Muharraq
- 2022: Sagesse
- 2022: Al Ahli Tripoli
- 2022–2023: Al Wehda
- 2023: Al-Muharraq
- 2023: San Lazaro Jobo Bonito
- 2023–2024: Homenetmen Beirut
- 2024–2025: Al-Ahli Manama
- 2025-present: Kazma SC

Dewayne Pernell Jackson (born November 30, 1990) is an American professional basketball player for Al-Ahli Manama of the Bahraini Premier League.

Jackson attended Morgan State University in Maryland and played on their men's basketball team from 2009–2013. At Morgan State, Jackson averaged 12.5 points per game over the 128 games in which he appeared.

On August 14, 2018, he signed with Champville SC. Jackson spent the 2020–21 season with Al Ahli Tripoli and helped lead the team to a league title. On August 28, 2021, he signed in Bahrain with Al-Muharraq.

On October 29, 2022, Jackson signed with Al Wehda. On March 30, 2023, Jackson signed with Al-Muharraq. On October 24, 2023, Jackson signed with Homenetmen Beirut.

On August 3, 2024, Jackson signed with Beirut Club of the Lebanese Basketball League. On October 24, 2024, Jackson signed with Al-Ahli Manama of the Bahraini Premier League.

== The Basketball Tournament ==
DeWayne Jackson played for HBC Sicklerville in the 2018 edition of The Basketball Tournament. He scored 16 points and had 2 steals in the team's first-round loss to the Talladega Knights.
