= 2002–03 Oklahoma State Cowboys basketball team =

American college basketball season

2002–03 Oklahoma State Cowboys basketball

NCAA tournament, second round
- Conference: Big 12 Conference

Ranking
- Coaches: No. 24
- Record: 22–10 (10–6 Big 12)
- Head coach: Eddie Sutton (13th season)
- Assistant coaches: Sean Sutton; Kyle Keller (4th season)
- Home arena: Gallagher-Iba Arena (Capacity: 6,381)

2002–03 Big 12 men's basketball standings
	Conf.				Overall
Team	W		L	PCT	W		L	PCT
No. 6 Kansas	14	–	2	.875	30	–	8	.789
No. 5 Texas	13	–	3	.813	26	–	7	.788
No. 3 Oklahoma †	12	–	4	.750	27	–	7	.794
Oklahoma State	10	–	6	.625	22	–	10	.688
No. 24 Missouri	9	–	7	.563	22	–	11	.667
Colorado	9	–	7	.563	20	–	12	.625
Texas Tech	6	–	10	.375	22	–	13	.629
Texas A&M	6	–	10	.375	14	–	14	.500
Iowa State	5	–	11	.313	17	–	14	.548
Baylor	5	–	11	.313	14	–	14	.500
Kansas State	4	–	12	.250	13	–	17	.433
Nebraska	3	–	13	.188	11	–	19	.367
† 2003 Big 12 Tournament winner Rankings from AP poll

The 2002–03 Oklahoma State Cowboys basketball team represented Oklahoma State University as a member of the Big 12 Conference during the 2002–03 NCAA Division I men's basketball season. They were led by 13th-year head coach Eddie Sutton and played their home games at Gallagher-Iba Arena in Stillwater, Oklahoma. They finished the season 22–10, 10–6 in Big 12 play to finish in fourth place. The Cowboys lost to Missouri in the quarterfinals of the Big 12 tournament. The team received an at-large bid to the NCAA tournament as the No. 6 seed in the East region. Oklahoma State beat Penn in the opening round, but lost to No. 3 seed and eventual National champion Syracuse in the second round.

== Roster ==
2002–03 Oklahoma State Cowboys men's basketball team
Players
Coaches

Pos.	#	Name	Height	Weight	Year	Previous school	Hometown
G	5	Victor Williams	5 ft 10 in (1.78 m)	—	Sr
F	23	Ivan McFarlin	6 ft 8 in (2.03 m)	240 lb (109 kg)	So	Houston, Texas
G	24	Tony Allen	6 ft 4 in (1.93 m)	213 lb (97 kg)	Jr	Chicago, Illinois
G	34	Melvin Sanders	6 ft 5 in (1.96 m)	210 lb (95 kg)	Jr	Liberal, Kansas

Head coach

- Eddie Sutton

Assistant coach(es)

- Sean Sutton
- Kyle Keller

Legend

- (C) Team captain
- (S) Suspended
- (I) Ineligible
- (W) Walk-on
- Injured
- Current redshirt

== Schedule and results ==
Date time, TV	Rank^{#}	Opponent^{#}	Result	Record	Site city, state
Regular season
Nov 22, 2002*		Yale	W 68–59	1–0	Gallagher-Iba Arena; Stillwater, Oklahoma
Nov 27, 2002*		at Alaska Anchorage; Great Alaska Shootout	W 98–69	2–0	Sullivan Arena; Anchorage, Alaska
Nov 29, 2002*		vs. College of Charleston; Great Alaska Shootout	L 58–66	2–1	Sullivan Arena; Anchorage, Alaska
Nov 30, 2002*		vs. No. 9 Michigan State; Great Alaska Shootout	W 64–61	3–1	Sullivan Arena; Anchorage, Alaska
Dec 21, 2002*		at Wichita State	W 68–58	8–1	Kansas Coliseum; Wichita, Kansas
Dec 30, 2002*		Arkansas	W 71–45	9–1	Gallagher-Iba Arena; Stillwater, Oklahoma
Big 12 Tournament
Mar 14, 2003*	(4)	vs. (5) Missouri; Quarterfinals	L 58–60	21–9	American Airlines Center; Dallas, Texas
NCAA Tournament
Mar 21, 2003*	(6 E)	vs. (11 E) Pennsylvania; First Round	W 77–63	22–9	TD Garden; Boston, Massachusetts
Mar 23, 2003*	(6 E)	vs. (3 E) No. 13 Syracuse; Second Round	L 56–68	22–10	TD Garden; Boston, Massachusetts
*Non-conference game. ^{#}Rankings from AP poll. (#) Tournament seedings in parentheses. E=East.
