= Homenetmen Antelias =

Lebanese sports club

Homenetmen Antelias (Arabic: نادي الهومنتمن أنطلياس Armenian: Հ.Մ.Ը.Մ. Անթիլիաս) is a Lebanese sports club most known for its basketball program playing in top division for women. It is located in Antelias, Matn District, Lebanon and is part of Homenetmen Lebanon. Homenetmen Antelias was established in 1970. It plays its home games at the club's own stadium in Mezher, Lebanon.

Homenetmen Antelias basketball team for women is part of the Lebanese Basketball League. It finished second overall in the 2008-2009 season with a record of 10-3 only second to top league champions Antranik SC with 13-0.

== See also ==
- Homenetmen Beirut F.C.
- Homenetmen Beirut B.C.
- Homenetmen Bourj Hammoud
