= Homenetmen Bourj Hammoud =

Lebanese multi-sports club

- Full name: Homenetmen Sports Association Bourj Hammoud
- Nickname: Homenetmenagan (The Orange Devils)
- Founded: 1935; 91 years ago
- Ground: Bourj Hammoud Stadium
- Capacity: 8,000
- Head coach: Andrew Oakley
- League: Lebanese Third Division
- 2025–26: Lebanese Third Division – Group B, 4th of 8
Home colours

Homenetmen Bourj Hamoud (Arabic: نادي الهومنتمن برج حمود; Armenian: Հ.Մ.Ը.Մ. Պուրճ Համուտ) is a multi-sports club based in Bourj Hammoud, Lebanon. Established in 1935, it is part of Homenetmen Lebanon.

The club is mostly known for its basketball program. The women's basketball team is part of the Lebanese Basketball League. It finished last in the 2008–09 season. and 7th in the 2009–10 season.

In 2025, the football team won the 2024–25 Lebanese Fourth Division title, and were promoted to the Lebanese Third Division.

== Honours ==
=== Men's football ===
Lebanese Fourth Division

- Winners (1): 2024–25

== See also ==
- Homenetmen Antelias
- Homenetmen Beirut (football)
- Homenetmen Beirut (basketball)
