= Nadim Souaid =

Lebanese basketball player (born 1986)

Free agent
- Position: Shooting guard / small forward

Personal information
- Born: August 20, 1986 (age 40) Byblos, Lebanon
- Listed height: 1.92 m (6 ft 4 in)
- Listed weight: 89 kg (196 lb)

Career information
- Playing career: 2011–present

Career history
- 2011–2012: Bejjeh SC
- 2012–2013: Champville SC
- 2013–2014: Tadamon Zouk
- 2015–2017: Homenetmen BC
- 2017–2018: Sagesse Club
- 2018–2019: Champville SC
- 2019–2021: Sagesse Club
- 2021–2022: Beirut Club
- 2022–2024: Nadim Souaid Academy

Nadim Souaid (born 20 August 1986) is a Lebanese basketball player who last played for the Nadim Souaid Academy in the Lebanese Basketball League. During the 2011–12 season, he played for Bejjeh SC, showcasing impressive statistics with an average of 18.9 points per game, 7.1 rebounds, 3.2 assists, and 1.6 steals. In the 2012–13 season, Nadim played for Champville SC, maintaining strong performance with averages of 9.5 points, 3.7 rebounds, and 2 assists per game.

Moving on to the 2013–14 season, Nadim contributed significantly to Tadamon Zouk, averaging 14.2 points, 3.5 rebounds, and 2.9 assists per game. He is also a valued member of the Lebanon national basketball team, having competed in the 2013 William Jones Cup. Nadim signed with Homenetmen BC in 2015.

In 2017, Nadim Souaid joined Sagesse Club. However, in July 2018, he made the move to Champville SC. After a successful stint, he returned to Sagesse Club in 2019. In 2021, he transitioned to Beirut Club, where he contributed to securing a championship title for the team.

Even following his retirement, Souaid continues to make impact on the basketball scene in Lebanon. He is the main part of Nadim Souaid Academy, contributing notably to the D1 team.
