= 2003 Big 12 men's basketball tournament =

- Classification: Division I
- Season: 2002–03
- Teams: 12
- Site: American Airlines Center; Dallas, Texas
- Champions: Oklahoma (3rd title)
- Winning coach: Kelvin Sampson (3rd title)
- MVP: Hollis Price (Oklahoma)
- Attendance: 94,800 (overall); 19,100 (championship)
- Top scorer: Andre Emmett (Texas Tech) (72 points)
- Television: ESPN

2002–03 Big 12 men's basketball standings
	Conf.				Overall
Team	W		L	PCT	W		L	PCT
No. 6 Kansas	14	–	2	.875	30	–	8	.789
No. 5 Texas	13	–	3	.813	26	–	7	.788
No. 3 Oklahoma †	12	–	4	.750	27	–	7	.794
Oklahoma State	10	–	6	.625	22	–	10	.688
No. 24 Missouri	9	–	7	.563	22	–	11	.667
Colorado	9	–	7	.563	20	–	12	.625
Texas Tech	6	–	10	.375	22	–	13	.629
Texas A&M	6	–	10	.375	14	–	14	.500
Iowa State	5	–	11	.313	17	–	14	.548
Baylor	5	–	11	.313	14	–	14	.500
Kansas State	4	–	12	.250	13	–	17	.433
Nebraska	3	–	13	.188	11	–	19	.367
† 2003 Big 12 Tournament winner Rankings from AP poll

The 2003 Big 12 men's basketball tournament was played at the American Airlines Center in Dallas, Texas, making it the first time the tournament was ever played outside Kansas City.

== Seeding ==
The Tournament consisted of a 12 team single-elimination tournament with the top 4 seeds receiving a bye.

2003 Big 12 Men's Basketball Tournament seeds
Seed	School	Conf.	Over.	Tiebreaker
1	Kansas ‡#	14–2	30–8	
2	Texas #	13–3	26–7	
3	Oklahoma #	12–4	27–7	
4	Oklahoma State #	10–6	22–10	
5	Missouri	9–7	22–11	
6	Colorado	9–7	20–12	
7	Texas Tech	6–10	22–13	
8	Texas A&M	6–10	14–14	
9	Iowa State	5–11	17–14	
10	Baylor	5–11	14–14	
11	Kansas State	4–12	13–17	
12	Nebraska	3–13	11–19	
‡ – Big 12 Conference regular season champions, and tournament No. 1 seed. # – Received a single-bye in the conference tournament. Overall records include all games played in the Big 12 Conference tournament.

== Schedule ==
Session	Game	Time	Matchup	Television	Attendance
First Round – Thursday, March 13
1	1	12:00 pm	#9 Iowa State 97 vs #8 Texas A&M 70	Big 12	9,100
1	2	2:20 pm	#5 Missouri 70 vs #12 Nebraska 61	Big 12	9,100
2	3	6:00 pm	#7 Texas Tech 68 vs #10 Baylor 65	Big 12	12,200
2	4	8:30 pm	#6 Colorado 77 vs #11 Kansas State 76	ESPN2	12,200
Quarterfinals – Friday, March 14
3	5	12:00 pm	#1 Kansas 89 vs #9 Iowa State 74	Big 12	16,200
3	6	2:20 pm	#5 Missouri 60 vs #4 Oklahoma State 58	Big 12	16,200
4	7	6:00 pm	#7 Texas Tech 92 vs #2 Texas 81	Big 12	19,100
4	8	8:30 pm	#3 Oklahoma 74 vs #6 Colorado 59	Big 12	19,100
Semifinals – Saturday, March 15
5	9	1:00 pm	#5 Missouri 68 vs #1 Kansas 63	Big 12/ESPN2	19,100
5	10	3:20 pm	#3 Oklahoma 67 vs #7 Texas Tech 60 ^{OT}	Big 12/ESPN2	19,100
Final – Sunday, March 16
6	11	2:00 pm	#3 Oklahoma 49 vs #5 Missouri 47	ESPN	19,100
Game times in CT. #-Rankings denote tournament seed

== Bracket ==
First Round; Thursday, March 13
8	Texas A&M	70
9	Iowa St	97
5	Missouri	70
12	Nebraska	61
6	Colorado	77
11	Kansas State	76
7	Texas Tech	68
10	Baylor	65

Quarterfinals; Friday, March 14
9	Iowa St	74
1	#4 Kansas	89
5	Missouri	60
4	#23 Oklahoma St	58
6	Colorado	59
3	#6 Oklahoma	74
2	#3 Texas	81
7	Texas Tech	92

Semifinals; Saturday, March 15
1	#4 Kansas	63
5	Missouri	68
3	#6 Oklahoma	67*
7	Texas Tech	60

Finals; Sunday, March 16
5	Missouri	47
3	#6 Oklahoma	49

* Indicates overtime game

== All-Tournament Team ==
Most Outstanding Player – Hollis Price, Oklahoma

Player	Team	Position	Class
Hollis Price	Oklahoma	Sr.	G
Quannas White	Oklahoma	Sr.	G
Arthur Johnson	Missouri	Jr.	C
Rickey Paulding	Missouri	Jr.	F
Andre Emmett	Texas Tech	Jr.	G

== See also ==
- 2003 Big 12 Conference women's basketball tournament
- 2003 NCAA Division I men's basketball tournament
- 2002–03 NCAA Division I men's basketball rankings
