= 2002–03 Texas Tech Red Raiders basketball team =

American college basketball season

2002–03 Texas Tech Red Raiders basketball

National Invitation Tournament Third place, W 71–61 v. Minnesota
- Conference: Big 12 Conference
- South
- Record: 22–13 (6–10 Big 12)
- Head coach: Bob Knight (2nd season)
- Assistant coaches: Pat Knight (2nd season); Chris Beard (2nd season); Bob Beyer (2nd season)
- Home arena: United Spirit Arena

2002–03 Big 12 men's basketball standings
	Conf.				Overall
Team	W		L	PCT	W		L	PCT
No. 6 Kansas	14	–	2	.875	30	–	8	.789
No. 5 Texas	13	–	3	.813	26	–	7	.788
No. 3 Oklahoma †	12	–	4	.750	27	–	7	.794
Oklahoma State	10	–	6	.625	22	–	10	.688
No. 24 Missouri	9	–	7	.563	22	–	11	.667
Colorado	9	–	7	.563	20	–	12	.625
Texas Tech	6	–	10	.375	22	–	13	.629
Texas A&M	6	–	10	.375	14	–	14	.500
Iowa State	5	–	11	.313	17	–	14	.548
Baylor	5	–	11	.313	14	–	14	.500
Kansas State	4	–	12	.250	13	–	17	.433
Nebraska	3	–	13	.188	11	–	19	.367
† 2003 Big 12 Tournament winner Rankings from AP poll

The 2002–03 Texas Tech Red Raiders men's basketball team represented Texas Tech University in the Big 12 Conference during the 2002–03 NCAA Division I men's basketball season. The head coach was Bob Knight, his 2nd year with the team. The Red Raiders played their home games in the United Spirit Arena in Lubbock, Texas.

== Roster ==
2002–03 Texas Tech Red Raiders men's basketball team
Players
Coaches

Pos.	#	Name	Height	Weight	Year	Hometown
G	14	Andre Emmett	6 ft 5 in (1.96 m)	230 lb (104 kg)	Jr	Dallas, Texas
G	15	Ronald Ross	6 ft 2 in (1.88 m)	185 lb (84 kg)	So	Hobbs, New Mexico
F	22	Kasib Powell	6 ft 7 in (2.01 m)	215 lb (98 kg)	Sr	Teaneck, New Jersey

Head coach

- Bob Knight

Assistant coach(es)

- Pat Knight
- Chris Beard
- Bob Beyer

Legend

- (C) Team captain
- (S) Suspended
- (I) Ineligible
- (W) Walk-on
- Injured
- Current redshirt

== Schedule and results ==
Date time, TV	Rank^{#}	Opponent^{#}	Result	Record	Site city, state
Regular Season
Big 12 Tournament
National Invitation Tournament
*Non-conference game. ^{#}Rankings from AP Poll. (#) Tournament seedings in parentheses. All times are in Central Time.
