= 2002–03 Iowa State Cyclones men's basketball team =

American college basketball season

2002–03 Iowa State Cyclones men's basketball
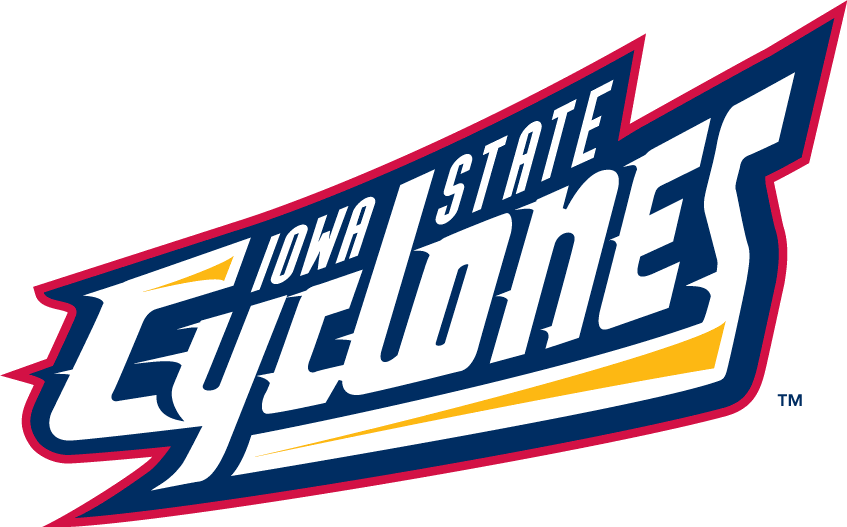

2003 NIT, Second round
- Conference: Big 12 Conference
- Record: 17-14 (5-11 Big 12)
- Head coach: Larry Eustachy (5th season)
- Assistant coaches: Wayne Morgan; Steve Barnes; Bob Sundvold
- Home arena: Hilton Coliseum

2002–03 Big 12 men's basketball standings
	Conf.				Overall
Team	W		L	PCT	W		L	PCT
No. 6 Kansas	14	–	2	.875	30	–	8	.789
No. 5 Texas	13	–	3	.813	26	–	7	.788
No. 3 Oklahoma †	12	–	4	.750	27	–	7	.794
Oklahoma State	10	–	6	.625	22	–	10	.688
No. 24 Missouri	9	–	7	.563	22	–	11	.667
Colorado	9	–	7	.563	20	–	12	.625
Texas Tech	6	–	10	.375	22	–	13	.629
Texas A&M	6	–	10	.375	14	–	14	.500
Iowa State	5	–	11	.313	17	–	14	.548
Baylor	5	–	11	.313	14	–	14	.500
Kansas State	4	–	12	.250	13	–	17	.433
Nebraska	3	–	13	.188	11	–	19	.367
† 2003 Big 12 Tournament winner Rankings from AP poll

The 2002–03 Iowa State Cyclones men's basketball team represented Iowa State University during the 2002–03 NCAA Division I men's basketball season. The Cyclones were coached by Larry Eustachy, who was in his fifth (and final) season. They played their home games at Hilton Coliseum in Ames, Iowa and competed in the Big 12 Conference.

== Previous season ==
The Cyclones finished 12–19, 4–12 in Big 12 play to finish 11th in the regular season conference standings.

== Incoming players ==
Incoming players
Name	Position	Height	Weight	Previous school	Hometown
Adam Haluska	Guard	6'5"	210 lbs.	Carroll High	Carroll, Iowa
John Neal	Guard	6'3"	180 lbs.	Winterset High	Winterset, Iowa
Jackson Vroman	Forward	6'10"	220 lbs.	Snow College	Bountiful, Utah
Tim Barnes	Guard	6'10"	160 lbs.	Southeastern Illinois	Henderson, Kentucky
Chris Alexander	Center	7'1"	235 lbs.	Indian Hills CC	Riverdale, Illinois

== Roster ==
2002–03 Iowa State Cyclones men's basketball team
Players
Coaches

Pos.	#	Name	Height	Weight	Year	Previous school	Hometown
G	0	Jake Sullivan (C)	6 ft 1 in (1.85 m)	195 lb (88 kg)	Jr	Tartan High	Oakdale, Minnesota
F	1	Omar Bynum (C)	6 ft 7 in (2.01 m)	210 lb (95 kg)	Sr	Omaha North	Omaha, Nebraska
G	2	Adam Haluska	6 ft 5 in (1.96 m)	210 lb (95 kg)	Fr	Carroll High	Carroll, Iowa
F	3	Clint Varley	6 ft 4 in (1.93 m)	225 lb (102 kg)	Sr	Greenfield High	Menlo, Iowa
F	4	Jackson Vroman	6 ft 10 in (2.08 m)	220 lb (100 kg)	Jr	Snow College	Bountiful, Utah
G	11	Ricky Morgan	5 ft 11 in (1.8 m)	185 lb (84 kg)	So	Pontiac Northern	Pontiac, Michigan
G	12	Tim Barnes	6 ft 0 in (1.83 m)	160 lb (73 kg)	Jr	Southeastern Illinois	Henderson, Kentucky
F	15	Adam Schaper	6 ft 9 in (2.06 m)	215 lb (98 kg)	So	Kankakee Valley	DeMotte, Indiana
G	33	John Neal	6 ft 3 in (1.91 m)	180 lb (82 kg)	Fr	Winterset High	Winterset, Iowa
C	34	Chris Alexander	7 ft 1 in (2.16 m)	235 lb (107 kg)	Jr	Indian Hills CC	Riverdale, Illinois
G	40	Brad Davis	6 ft 2 in (1.88 m)	215 lb (98 kg)	Sr	Knoxville High	Knoxville, Iowa
G	42	Justin Fries	6 ft 2 in (1.88 m)	200 lb (91 kg)	Sr	Washington High	Sioux Falls, South Dakota
G/F	50	Marcus Jefferson	6 ft 5 in (1.96 m)	205 lb (93 kg)	RS Jr	Notre Dame Prep	East Chicago
C	51	Jared Homan	6 ft 9 in (2.06 m)	230 lb (104 kg)	So	St. Mary's	Remsen, Iowa
C	54	Andrew Skoglund	7 ft 1 in (2.16 m)	250 lb (113 kg)	Jr	Hopkins High	Minnetonka, Minnesota

Head coach

- Larry Eustachy (Long Beach State)

Assistant coach(es)

- Wayne Morgan (St. Lawrence)
- Steve Barnes (Azusa Pacific)
- Bob Sundvold (South Dakota State)

Legend

- (C) Team captain
- (S) Suspended
- (I) Ineligible
- (W) Walk-on
- Injured
- Current redshirt

== Schedule and results ==
Date time, TV	Rank^{#}	Opponent^{#}	Result	Record	Site city, state
Exhibition
November 2, 2002*; 7:00 pm		Illinois-All Stars; Exhibition	W 95-77		Hilton Coliseum; Ames, Iowa
November 18, 2002*; 7:00 pm		Global Sports; Exhibition	W 72-69		Hilton Coliseum; Ames, Iowa
Regular season
November 25, 2002*; 7:00 pm		Coe College	W 87-65	1-0	Hilton Coliseum; Ames, Iowa
November 29, 2002*; 7:00 pm		Mercer	W 91-60	2-0	Hilton Coliseum; Ames, Iowa
December 2, 2002*; 7:00 pm		Jackson State	W 85-63	3-0	Hilton Coliseum; Ames, Iowa
December 6, 2002*; 8:00 pm, Cyclone Television Network		Western Illinois; Cyclone Challenge	W 59-44	4-0	Hilton Coliseum; Ames, Iowa
December 7, 2002*; 8:00 pm, Cyclone Television Network		Binghamton; Cyclone Challenge	W 86-56	5-0	Hilton Coliseum; Ames, Iowa
December 10, 2002*; 6:00 pm, ESPN		Boston College	L 78-85	5-1	Hilton Coliseum; Ames, Iowa
December 13, 2002*; 7:00 pm, Hawkeye Television Network		at Iowa; Rivalry	W 73-69	6-1	Carver–Hawkeye Arena; Iowa City, Iowa
December 15, 2002*; 1:00 pm, Cyclone Television Network		Savannah State	W 79-59	7-1	Hilton Coliseum; Ames, Iowa
December 22, 2002*; 1:00 pm, Cyclone Television Network		Drake	W 76-55	8-1	Knapp Center; Des Moines, Iowa
December 29, 2002*; 7:00 pm, UNITV (KFXA)		at UNI	W 71-64	9-1	UNI-Dome; Cedar Falls, Iowa
December 31, 2002*; 6:00 pm		Arkansas–Pine Bluff	W 90-46	10-1	Hilton Coliseum; Ames, Iowa
January 6, 2003; 8:00 pm, ESPN		No. 14 Kansas	L 54-83	10-2 (0-1)	Hilton Coliseum; Ames, Iowa
January 11, 2003; 8:00 pm, ESPN Plus		at No. 8 Texas	L 50-70	10-3 (0-2)	Frank Erwin Center; Austin, Texas
January 18, 2003; 3:00 pm, ESPN Plus		No. 5 Oklahoma	L 60-70	10-4 (0-3)	Hilton Coliseum; Ames, Iowa
January 21, 2003; 7:00 pm, Cyclone Television Network		at No. 21 Missouri	L 59-64	10-5 (0-4)	Hearnes Center; Columbia, Missouri
January 25, 2003; 12:45 pm, ESPN Plus		Nebraska	W 71-61	11-5 (1-4)	Hilton Coliseum; Ames, Iowa
January 29, 2003; 7:00 pm, Cyclone Television Network		at No. 9 Oklahoma State	L 55-68	11-6 (1-5)	Gallagher-Iba Arena; Stillwater, Oklahoma
February 1, 2003; 7:00 pm, Cyclone Television Network		Baylor	W 74-70	12-6 (2-5)	Hilton Coliseum; Ames, Iowa
February 8, 2003; 3:00 pm, ESPN Plus		at Colorado	L 69-84	12-7 (2-6)	Coors Events Center; Boulder, Colorado
February 12, 2003; 7:00 pm, Cyclone Television Network		Texas Tech	L 73-88	12-8 (2-7)	Hilton Coliseum; Ames, Iowa
February 16, 2003; 12:00 pm, ESPN Plus		at No. 9 Kansas	L 51-70	12-9 (2-8)	Allen Fieldhouse; Lawrence, Kansas
February 19, 2003; 7:00 pm		at Texas A&M	L 54-66	12-10 (2-9)	Reed Arena; College Station, Texas
February 22, 2003; 12:45 pm, ESPN Plus		Kansas State	W 64-61	13-10 (3-9)	Hilton Coliseum; Ames, Iowa
February 25, 2003; 7:00 pm, Cyclone Television Network		Colorado	W 81-55	14-10 (4-9)	Hilton Coliseum; Ames, Iowa
March 1, 2003; 7:00 pm, Cyclone Television Network		at Nebraska	L 63-69	14-11 (4-10)	Bob Devaney Sports Center; Lincoln, Nebraska
March 5, 2003; 7:00 pm, Cyclone Television Network		Missouri	W 71-55	15-11 (5-10)	Hilton Coliseum; Ames, Iowa
March 8, 2003; 7:00 pm, Cyclone Television Network		at Kansas State	L 63-74	15-12 (5-11)	Bramlage Coliseum; Manhattan, Kansas
Big 12 Tournament
March 13, 2003; 12:00 pm, ESPN Plus		vs. Texas A&M	W 97-70	16-12 (5-11)	Kemper Arena; Kansas City, Missouri
March 14, 2003; 12:00 pm, ESPN Plus		vs. No. 4 Kansas	L 74-89	16-13 (5-11)	Kemper Arena; Kansas City, Missouri
NIT Tournament
March 19, 2003; 7:00 pm		Wichita State; NIT Opening Round	W 76-65	17-13 (5-11)	Hilton Coliseum; Ames, Iowa
March 21, 2003; 7:00 pm		Iowa; NIT First round	L 53-54	17-14 (5-11)	Hilton Coliseum; Ames, Iowa
*Non-conference game. ^{#}Rankings from AP poll. (#) Tournament seedings in parentheses. All times are in Central Time.

== Awards and honors ==
- All-Conference Selections

Jake Sullivan (3rd Team)
Jackson Vroman (Honorable Mention)

- Academic All-American

Jake Sullivan (2003)

- Academic All-Big 12 First Team

Jake Sullivan (2003)
Jared Homan (2003)

- Ralph A. Olsen Award

Jake Sullivan (2003)
