= 2003 NCAA Division I men's basketball championship game =

Men's college basketball tournament game

2003 NCAA Tournament Championship Game
National championship game
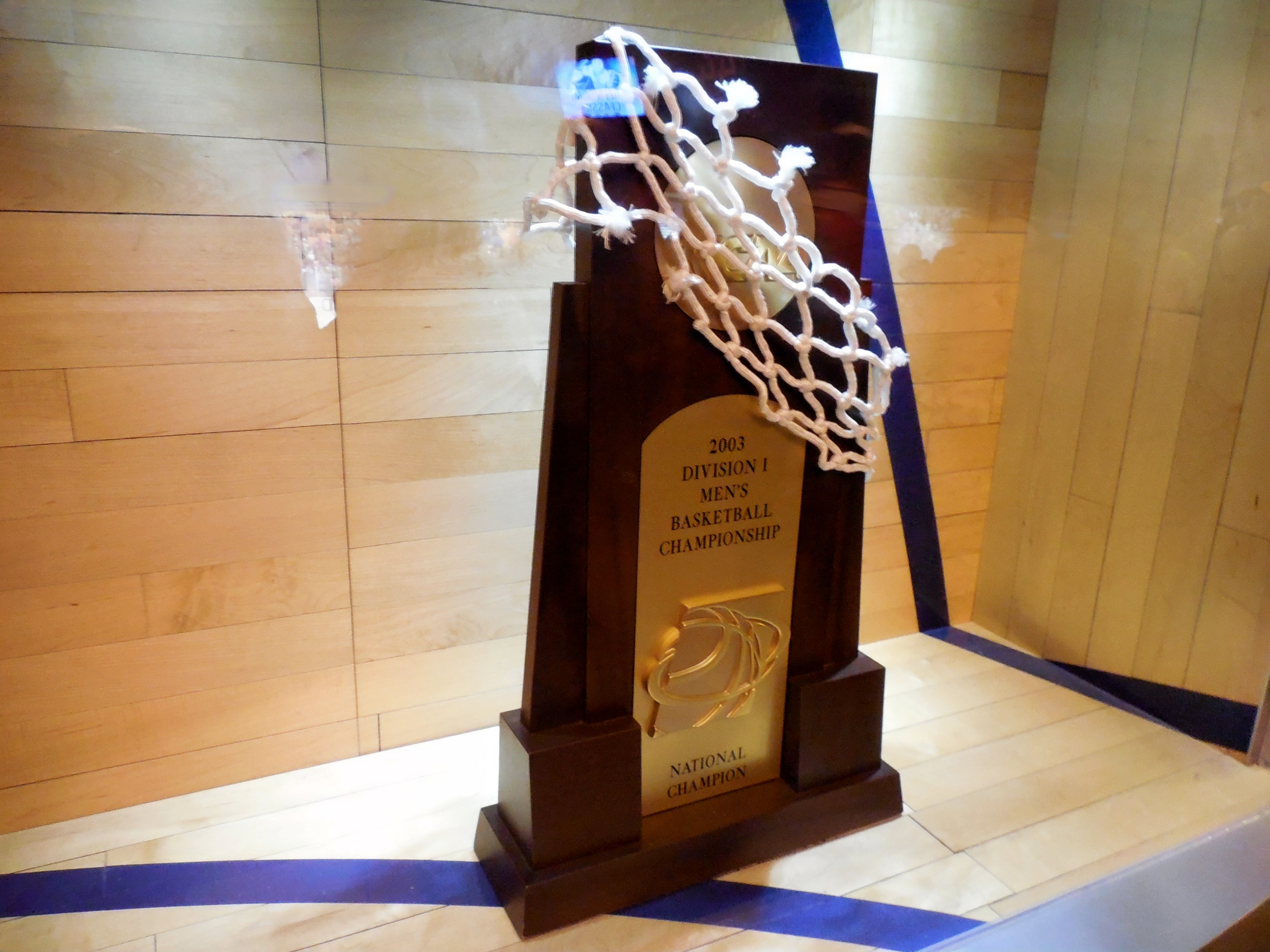
Syracuse Orangemen	Kansas Jayhawks
Big East	Big 12
(29–5)	(30–7)
81	78
Head coach: Jim Boeheim	Head coach: Roy Williams
- AP: 13
- Coaches: 12
- AP: 6
- Coaches: 6
	1st half	2nd half	Total
Syracuse Orangemen	53	28	81
Kansas Jayhawks	42	36	78
- Date: April 7, 2003
- Venue: Louisiana Superdome, New Orleans, Louisiana
- MVP: Carmelo Anthony, Syracuse
- Favorite: Kansas by 5
- Referees: Gerald Boudreaux, Reggie Cofer, Dick Cartmell
- Attendance: 54,524

United States TV coverage
- Network: CBS
- Announcers: Jim Nantz (play-by-play); Billy Packer (color); Bonnie Bernstein and Armen Keteyian (sideline)

The 2003 NCAA Division I men's basketball championship game was the finals of the 2003 NCAA Division I men's basketball tournament and it determined the national champion for the 2002-03 NCAA Division I men's basketball season. The game was played on April 7, 2003, at the Louisiana Superdome in New Orleans, Louisiana, and featured the West Regional Champion, #2-seeded Kansas versus the East Regional Champion, #3-seeded Syracuse. This was the first national championship game since 1989 to not feature a team from either the ACC or SEC.

== Participants ==
=== Syracuse Orangemen ===
Things did not start well for Syracuse. Guards DeShaun Williams and James Thues both left the team. Williams transferred to Iona while Thues left for Detroit. Freshman point guard Billy Edelin was suspended for 12 games for participating in a non-sanctioned basketball league. Syracuse then started its season with a loss against Memphis, despite Carmelo Anthony's 27 points, a then-high for a Syracuse freshman debut.

But things turned around, as Syracuse went 13–3 in the Big East, with several memorable wins. Gerry McNamara would establish himself as a clutch player, nailing a game-winning 3-pointer as then-No. 17 Syracuse notched an 82–80 win over then-No. 10 Notre Dame in February. In an upset of then-No. 24 Syracuse over then-No. 2 Pittsburgh, Jeremy McNeil, a career 49.1% free throw shooter, hit two key free throws, and added a game-winning tip in a 67–65 upset.

The Orangemen would play five Big 12 teams throughout the year, including games against Missouri in the regular season, and against Oklahoma (Elite Eight), Oklahoma State (second round), Texas (National Semifinal) and then Kansas (National Championship game).

=== Kansas Jayhawks ===
Kansas would get off to a rough start as they lost both games in the championship round of the 2002 Preseason NIT to North Carolina and #7 Florida. After dropping a game to #7 Oregon at the Rose Garden, Kansas would go on a 10-game winning streak which was highlighted by home victories over UCLA and Kansas State. Kansas then would suffer two consecutive losses to Colorado and #1 Arizona and would then go on a seven-game winning streak which included victories over #3 Texas, #21 Missouri Tigers men's basketball, and Kansas State, but that streak would end with a loss at #5 Oklahoma. Kansas would win their final four games of the regular season which was highlighted by victories over #16 Oklahoma State and Missouri. Kansas would win one game in the Big 12 Tournament before losing to Missouri in the semifinals. Kansas would get off to a slow start in the NCAA Tournament as they barely beat Utah State in the 1st round, but would catch fire during the rest of the NCAA tournament as they romped Arizona State in the 2nd round and would beat Duke and Arizona (avenging a loss from earlier this season) to reach the Final Four and would romp Marquette in the National Semifinals to reach the 2003 National Championship Game.

== Starting lineups ==
Syracuse	Position	Kansas
Gerry McNamara	G	Kirk Hinrich
Kueth Duany	G	Aaron Miles
Hakim Warrick	F	Keith Langford
Carmelo Anthony	F	† Nick Collison
Craig Forth	C	Jeff Graves
† 2003 Consensus First Team All-American

== Game Summary ==
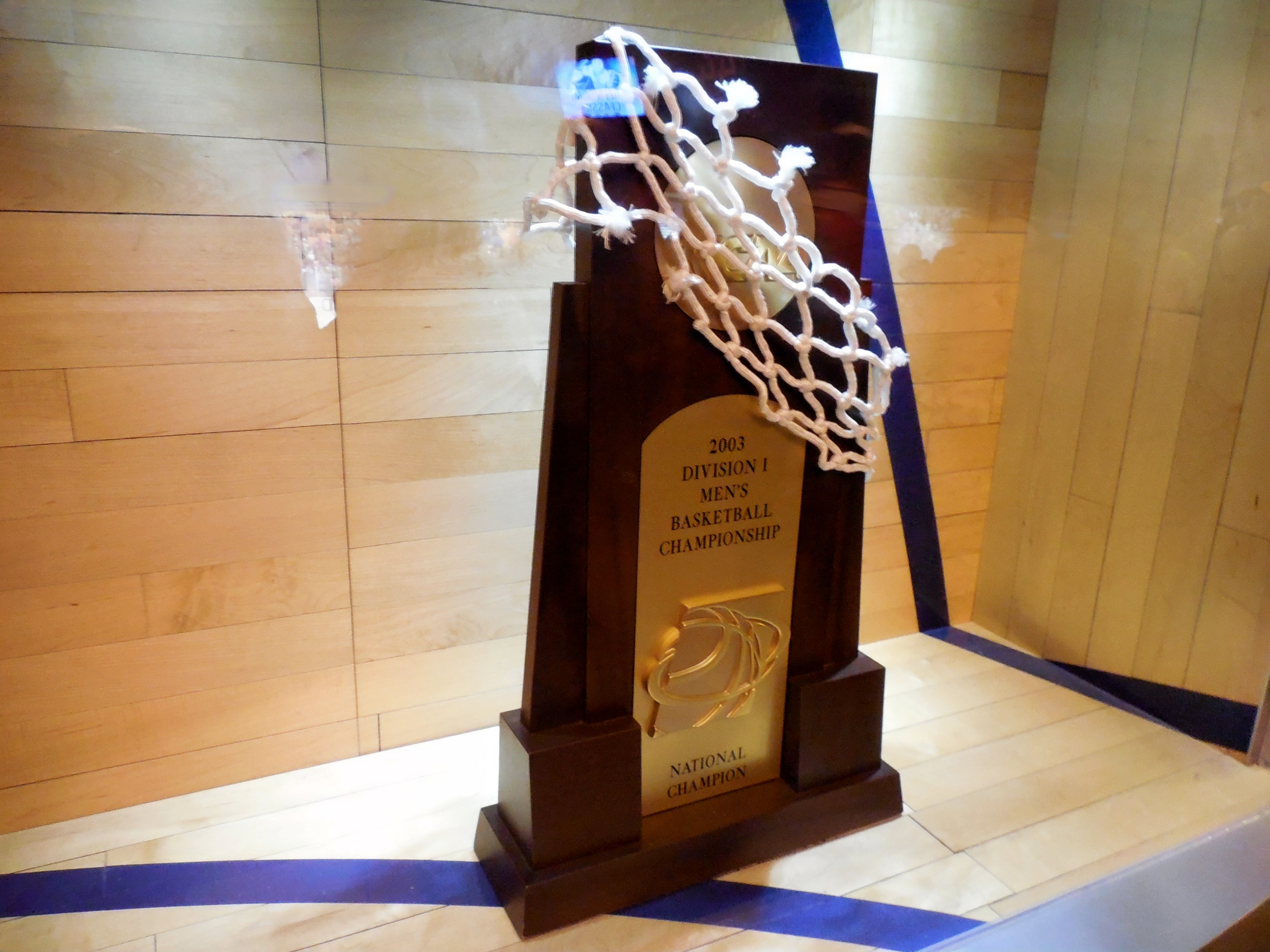
2003 NCAA Men's Basketball National Championship Trophy

Leading up to the championship game, much of the conversation revolved around how, no matter the outcome, one of the well-known head coaches would win their first championship. In Jim Boeheim's 27 years as head coach at Syracuse his team had been to two Final Fours, and finished runner-up each time (1987, 1996). Roy Williams, during his fifteen seasons as Kansas head coach, had reached the Final Four four times, and finished runner up once (1991). Syracuse dominated with a hot shooting first half to lead by 11 at the break. Gerry McNamara connected on an impressive six three-pointers in the half, which were his 18 points for the game. Kansas fought back to within 80–78 in the final minute and had a chance to tie after Hakim Warrick missed a pair of free throws in the final moments. Warrick, however, then blocked Michael Lee's three point attempt with 0.7 seconds remaining on the game clock. After Kirk Hinrich's three-pointer at the buzzer went over the net, Syracuse's victory gave them, and Jim Boeheim, their first ever national championship. Carmelo Anthony was named Most Outstanding Player (MOP) with 21 points in the win. Syracuse also avenged a second-round loss to Kansas two years earlier.
