= 2002–03 Oklahoma Sooners men's basketball team =

American college basketball season

2002–03 Oklahoma Sooners men's basketball

Big 12 Conference tournament champions

NCAA tournament, Elite Eight
- Conference: Big 12 Conference

Ranking
- Coaches: No. 7
- AP: No. 3
- Record: 27–7 (12–4 Big 12)
- Head coach: Kelvin Sampson (9th season)
- Assistant coaches: Ray Lopes; Bennie Seltzer; Jim Shaw
- Home arena: Lloyd Noble Center (Capacity: 12,000)

2002–03 Big 12 men's basketball standings
	Conf.				Overall
Team	W		L	PCT	W		L	PCT
No. 6 Kansas	14	–	2	.875	30	–	8	.789
No. 5 Texas	13	–	3	.813	26	–	7	.788
No. 3 Oklahoma †	12	–	4	.750	27	–	7	.794
Oklahoma State	10	–	6	.625	22	–	10	.688
No. 24 Missouri	9	–	7	.563	22	–	11	.667
Colorado	9	–	7	.563	20	–	12	.625
Texas Tech	6	–	10	.375	22	–	13	.629
Texas A&M	6	–	10	.375	14	–	14	.500
Iowa State	5	–	11	.313	17	–	14	.548
Baylor	5	–	11	.313	14	–	14	.500
Kansas State	4	–	12	.250	13	–	17	.433
Nebraska	3	–	13	.188	11	–	19	.367
† 2003 Big 12 Tournament winner Rankings from AP poll

The 2002–03 Oklahoma Sooners men's basketball team represented the University of Oklahoma as a member of the Big 12 Conference during the 2002–03 NCAA Division I men's basketball season. The team was led by head coach Kelvin Sampson and played its home games in the Lloyd Noble Center. With high expectations entering the season, Oklahoma finished third in the Big 12 regular season standings behind Kansas and Texas. The Sooners won the Big 12 Conference tournament to earn the conference's automatic bid and a No. 1 seed in the NCAA tournament. After reaching the Elite Eight by beating South Carolina State, California, and Butler, the Sooners fell to No. 3 seed and eventual National champion Syracuse in the regional final to finish the season 27–7 (12–4 Big 12).

== Roster ==
2002–03 Oklahoma Sooners men's basketball team
Players
Coaches

Pos.	#	Name	Height	Weight	Year	Hometown
G	2	Ebi Ere	6 ft 5 in (1.96 m)	215 lb (98 kg)	Sr	McLain	Tulsa, OK
G	4	Quannas White	6 ft 1 in (1.85 m)	190 lb (86 kg)	Sr	St. Augustine	New Orleans, LA
G	10	Hollis Price	6 ft 1 in (1.85 m)	165 lb (75 kg)	Sr	St. Augustine	New Orleans, LA
C	21	Jabahri Brown	6 ft 10 in (2.08 m)	210 lb (95 kg)	Jr	Champagnat Catholic	St. Thomas, VI

Head coach

- Kelvin Sampson (UNC Pembroke)

Assistant coach(es)

Legend

- (C) Team captain
- (S) Suspended
- (I) Ineligible
- (W) Walk-on
- Injured
- Current redshirt

== Schedule ==
Date time, TV	Rank^{#}	Opponent^{#}	Result	Record	Site (attendance) city, state
Regular season
Nov 14, 2002*	No. 3	vs. No. 8 Alabama; Coaches vs. Cancer Classic	L 62–68	0–1	Madison Square Garden (8,826); New York, New York
Nov 22, 2002*	No. 7	UC Irvine; Sooner invitational	W 87–65	1–1	Lloyd Noble Center (10,685); Norman, Oklahoma
Nov 23, 2002*	No. 7	Princeton; Sooner invitational	W 82–63	2–1	Lloyd Noble Center; Norman, Oklahoma
Nov 30, 2002*	No. 8	Prairie View	W 75–63	3–1	Lloyd Noble Center; Norman, Oklahoma
Jan 4, 2003*	No. 10	vs. No. 14 Michigan State; All-College Basketball Classic	W 60–58	8–2	Ford Center (18,034); Oklahoma City, Oklahoma
Jan 7, 2003*; ESPN2	No. 9	No. 3 Connecticut	W 73–63	9–2	Lloyd Noble Center (11,638); Norman, Oklahoma
Jan 11, 2003	No. 9	Colorado	W 69–54	10–2 (1–0)	Lloyd Noble Center; Norman, Oklahoma
Jan 13, 2003	No. 5	at No. 24 Oklahoma State	L 46–48	10–3 (1–1)	Gallagher-Iba Arena; Stillwater, Oklahoma
Mar 8, 2003	No. 5	No. 4 Texas	L 71–76	21–6 (12–4)	Lloyd Noble Center; Norman, Oklahoma
Big 12 tournament
Mar 14, 2003*	No. 6	vs. Colorado; Quarterfinal	W 74–59	22–6	American Airlines Center; Dallas, Texas
Mar 15, 2003*	No. 6	vs. Texas Tech; Semifinal	W 67–60 ^{OT}	23–6	American Airlines Center; Dallas, Texas
Mar 16, 2003*	No. 6	vs. Missouri; Championship Game	W 49–47	24–6	American Airlines Center; Dallas, Texas
NCAA tournament
Mar 20, 2003*	(1 E) No. 3	vs. (16 E) South Carolina State; First round	W 71–54	25–6	Ford Center; Oklahoma City, Oklahoma
Mar 22, 2003*	(1 E) No. 3	vs. (8 E) California; Second Round	W 74–65	26–6	Ford Center; Oklahoma City, Oklahoma
Mar 28, 2003*	(1 E) No. 3	vs. (12 E) Butler; East Regional semifinal – Sweet Sixteen	W 65–54	27–6	Times Union Center; Albany, New York
Mar 30, 2003*	(1 E) No. 3	vs. (3 E) No. 13 Syracuse; East Regional final – Elite Eight	L 47–63	27–7	Times Union Center; Albany, New York
*Non-conference game. ^{#}Rankings from AP poll. (#) Tournament seedings in parentheses. All times are in Central Time. (#) during NCAA Tournament is seed within region E=East.
