= Cy Alexander =

American basketball coach (born 1953)

Biographical details
- Born: September 9, 1953 (age 73); Winston-Salem, North Carolina, U.S.

Coaching career (HC unless noted)
- 1976–1987: Howard (assistant)
- 1987–2003: South Carolina State
- 2003–2009: Tennessee State
- 2012–2016: North Carolina A&T
- 2022–2023: Alcorn State (assistant)

Head coaching record
- Overall: 392–388
- Tournaments: 1–6 (NCAA Division I)

Accomplishments and honors

Championships
- 5 MEAC regular season (1989, 1996, 1999, 2000, 2003); 6 MEAC tournament (1989, 1996, 1998, 2000, 2003, 2013)

Awards
- MEAC Coach of the Year (2003)

Cyrus Walker Alexander III (born September 9, 1953) is an American former college basketball head coach who was most recently an assistant head coach at Alcorn State and held a head coaching position at North Carolina A&T University, having resigned on January 29, 2016 after 22 games into the 2015–16 season. He was also a longtime men's basketball coach at South Carolina State University. In April 2003, after 16 seasons at SCSU, Alexander moved to coach Tennessee State University. Alexander was fired as coach of TSU in February 2009. He was born in Winston-Salem, North Carolina.

On April 21, 2012, Alexander was hired as head coach of NC A&T. He resigned in January 2016 to pursue other opportunities within the North Carolina A&T athletics department. On August 9, 2022, he was named an assistant coach at Alcorn State.

== Head coaching record ==
Record table
Season	Team	Overall	Conference	Standing	Postseason
South Carolina State Bulldogs (Mid-Eastern Athletic Conference) (1987–2003)
1987–88	South Carolina State	16–13	10–6	3rd	
1988–89	South Carolina State	25–8	14–2	1st	NCAA Division I First Round
1989–90	South Carolina State	13–16	8–8	4th	
1990–91	South Carolina State	13–15	10–6	2nd	
1991–92	South Carolina State	14–15	9–7	4th	
1992–93	South Carolina State	16–13	9–7	2nd	
1993–94	South Carolina State	16–13	10–6	2nd	
1994–95	South Carolina State	15–13	11–5	2nd	
1995–96	South Carolina State	22–8	14–2	1st	NCAA Division I First Round
1996–97	South Carolina State	14–14	12–6	2nd	
1997–98	South Carolina State	22–8	16–2	2nd	NCAA Division I First Round
1998–99	South Carolina State	17–12	14–4	1st	
1999–00	South Carolina State	20–14	14–5	1st	NCAA Division I First Round
2000–01	South Carolina State	19–13	14–4	1st	
2001–02	South Carolina State	15–16	11–7	3rd	
2002–03	South Carolina State	20–11	15–3	1st	NCAA Division I First Round
South Carolina State:		276–200	204–80		
Tennessee State Tigers (Ohio Valley Conference) (2003–2009)
2003–04	Tennessee State	7–21	6–10	8th	
2004–05	Tennessee State	14–17	9–7	7th	
2005–06	Tennessee State	13–15	11–9	7th	
2006–07	Tennessee State	12–20	8–12	8th	
2007–08	Tennessee State	15–17	10–10	6th	
2008–09	Tennessee State	12–18	9–9	6th	
Tennessee State:		73–108	53–57		
North Carolina A&T Aggies (Mid-Eastern Athletic Conference) (2012–2016)
2012–13	North Carolina A&T	20–17	8–8	T–6th	NCAA Division I Second Round
2013–14	North Carolina A&T	9–23	5–11	T–8th	
2014–15	North Carolina A&T	9–23	6–10	T–9th	
2015–16	North Carolina A&T	5–17*	2–6*	T–6th	
North Carolina A&T:		43–80	21–35	* resigned on 1/29/16	
Total:		392–388			
National champion Postseason invitational champion Conference regular season champion Conference regular season and conference tournament champion Division regular season champion Division regular season and conference tournament champion Conference tournament champion
