= Michael Lee (basketball, born 1983) =

American basketball player

Golden State Warriors
- Title: Professional scout
- League: National Basketball Association

Personal information
- Born: February 3, 1983 (age 43) Portland, Oregon
- Listed height: 6 ft 3 in (1.91 m)
- Listed weight: 215 lb (98 kg)

Career information
- High school: Jefferson (Portland, Oregon)
- College: Kansas (2001–2005)
- NBA draft: 2005: undrafted
- Playing career: 2005–2007
- Position: Guard
- Number: 0

Career history

Coaching
- 2008–2010: Gardner–Webb (assistant)
- 2010–2013: San Francisco (assistant)
- 2015-2017: Roosevelt HS
- 2017–2021: Santa Cruz Warriors (assistant)

Michael Lee (born February 3, 1983) is an American retired professional basketball player and current scout for the Golden State Warriors of the National Basketball Association. He played college basketball for the Kansas Jayhawks. Standing at 6 ft 3 in (1.91 m), he played at the Guard position.

== High school career ==
Lee played for the Jefferson Democrats in Northeast Portland. The Democrats won the 2000 4A Oregon state championship, beating Tualatin 58–44, and capping a 28–0 season. The Democrats finished the year with a No. 4 national ranking and several other players went on to play in college, such as Aaron Miles (Kansas), Thomas Gardner (Missouri), and Brandon Brooks (USC).

== College career ==
Michael Lee attended the University of Kansas, where he starred at the guard position for the Kansas Jayhawks men's basketball team. He helped lead the Jayhawks to two consecutive Final Four appearances in 2002 and 2003 and an appearance in the 2003 national championship game.

== Coaching career ==
After a short professional playing career, Lee went into coaching with stints as an assistant coach with both Gardner–Webb and San Francisco.

On September 9, 2017, Lee was named assistant coach of the Santa Cruz Warriors, the NBA G League developmental affiliate of the Golden State Warriors. In 2021, he was moved the staff of the Golden State Warriors as a professional scout.
