= 2002–03 Colorado Buffaloes men's basketball team =

American college basketball season

2002–03 Colorado Buffaloes men's basketball

NCAA tournament, First Round
- Conference: Big 12 Conference
- Record: 20–12 (9–7 Big 12)
- Head coach: Ricardo Patton (7th season)
- Home arena: Coors Events Center

2002–03 Big 12 men's basketball standings
	Conf.				Overall
Team	W		L	PCT	W		L	PCT
No. 6 Kansas	14	–	2	.875	30	–	8	.789
No. 5 Texas	13	–	3	.813	26	–	7	.788
No. 3 Oklahoma †	12	–	4	.750	27	–	7	.794
Oklahoma State	10	–	6	.625	22	–	10	.688
No. 24 Missouri	9	–	7	.563	22	–	11	.667
Colorado	9	–	7	.563	20	–	12	.625
Texas Tech	6	–	10	.375	22	–	13	.629
Texas A&M	6	–	10	.375	14	–	14	.500
Iowa State	5	–	11	.313	17	–	14	.548
Baylor	5	–	11	.313	14	–	14	.500
Kansas State	4	–	12	.250	13	–	17	.433
Nebraska	3	–	13	.188	11	–	19	.367
† 2003 Big 12 Tournament winner Rankings from AP poll

The 2002–03 Colorado Buffaloes Men's basketball team represented the University of Colorado as a member of the Big 12 Conference during the 2002–03 season. Led by 7th-year head coach Ricardo Patton, the Buffaloes played their home games at the Coors Events Center in Boulder, Colorado. After finishing 4th in the conference regular season standings, Colorado reached the semifinal round of the Big 12 tournament. The team did receive an at-large bid to the NCAA tournament as No. 10 seed in the South region – the program's first NCAA tournament selection in six seasons. Colorado would lose to Michigan State in the opening round to finish the season with a 20–12 record (9–7 Big 12).

== Roster ==
2002–03 Colorado Buffaloes men's basketball team
Players
Coaches

Pos.	#	Name	Height	Weight	Year	Previous school	Hometown
C	13	David Harrison	7 ft 0 in (2.13 m)	280 lb (127 kg)	So		Brentwood, Tennessee
F	15	Chris Copeland	6 ft 8 in (2.03 m)	235 lb (107 kg)	Fr		Richmond, Virginia
G	30	Michel Morandais	6 ft 5 in (1.96 m)	205 lb (93 kg)	Jr	Life Center Academy
F	34	Stéphane Pelle	6 ft 9 in (2.06 m)	249 lb (113 kg)	Sr		Burtonsville, Maryland

Head coach

Ricardo Patton

Assistant coach(es)

Legend

- (C) Team captain
- (S) Suspended
- (I) Ineligible
- (W) Walk-on
- Injured
- Current redshirt

== Schedule and results ==
Date time, TV	Rank^{#}	Opponent^{#}	Result	Record	Site city, state
Non-conference regular season
Nov 22, 2002*		Cal Poly	W 97–69	1–0	Coors Events Center; Boulder, Colorado
Nov 24, 2002*		Stetson	W 107–74	2–0	Coors Events Center; Boulder, Colorado
Nov 27, 2002*		at New Mexico State	L 71–75	2–1	Pan American Center; Las Cruces, New Mexico
Dec 3, 2002*		Georgia	L 70–71	2–2	Coors Events Center; Boulder, Colorado
Dec 7, 2002*		at Kansas City	W 62–59	3–2	Municipal Auditorium; Kansas City, Missouri
Dec 11, 2002*		Chicago State	W 80–61	4–2	Coors Events Center; Boulder, Colorado
Dec 21, 2002*		at Rice	L 61–80	4–3	Rice Gymnasium; Houston, Texas
Dec 23, 2002*		North Texas	W 87–71	5–3	Coors Events Center; Boulder, Colorado
Dec 27, 2002*		vs. Louisiana-Lafayette	W 75–56	6–3	Dale F. Halton Arena; Charlotte, North Carolina
Dec 28, 2002*		at Charlotte	W 76–74	7–3	Dale F. Halton Arena; Charlotte, North Carolina
Dec 29, 2002*		vs. Loyola (IL)	W 76–72	8–3	Dale F. Halton Arena; Charlotte, North Carolina
Jan 4, 2003*		Penn	W 80–57	9–3	Coors Events Center; Boulder, Colorado
Jan 7, 2003*		Colorado State	W 93–72	10–3	Coors Events Center; Boulder, Colorado
Big 12 Regular Season
Jan 11, 2003		at No. 9 Oklahoma	L 54–69	10–4 (0–1)	Lloyd Noble Center; Norman, Oklahoma
Jan 15, 2003		Kansas State	W 69–63	11–4 (1–1)	Coors Events Center; Boulder, Colorado
Jan 18, 2003		at Nebraska	L 77–80 ^{OT}	11–5 (1–2)	Bob Devaney Sports Center; Lincoln, Nebraska
Jan 22, 2003		No. 6 Kansas	W 60–59	12–5 (2–2)	Coors Events Center; Boulder, Colorado
Jan 29, 2003		at Texas Tech	L 56–66	12–6 (2–3)	United Spirit Arena; Lubbock, Texas
Feb 1, 2003		at No. 25 Missouri	L 70–73	12–7 (2–4)	Hearnes Center; Columbia, Missouri
Feb 4, 2003		No. 3 Texas	W 93–80	13–7 (3–4)	Coors Events Center; Boulder, Colorado
Feb 8, 2003		Iowa State	W 84–69	14–7 (4–4)	Coors Events Center; Boulder, Colorado
Feb 11, 2003		at Kansas State	L 54–62	14–8 (4–5)	Bramlage Coliseum; Manhattan, Kansas
Feb 15, 2003*		Texas A&M	W 98–83	15–8 (5–5)	Coors Events Center; Boulder, Colorado
Feb 19, 2003		at No. 6 Kansas	L 87–94	15–9 (5–6)	Allen Fieldhouse; Lawrence, Kansas
Feb 22, 2003		Missouri	W 89–68	16–9 (6–6)	Coors Events Center; Boulder, Colorado
Feb 25, 2003		at Iowa State	L 55–81	16–10 (6–7)	Hilton Coliseum; Ames, Iowa
Mar 1, 2003		at Baylor	W 72–59	17–10 (7–7)	Ferrell Center; Waco, Texas
Mar 5, 2003		No. 20 Oklahoma State	W 68–56	18–10 (8–7)	Coors Events Center; Boulder, Colorado
Mar 8, 2003		Nebraska	W 84–69	19–10 (9–7)	Coors Events Center; Boulder, Colorado
Big 12 Tournament
Mar 13, 2003*		vs. Kansas State; Quarterfinals	W 77–76	20–10	American Airlines Center; Dallas, Texas
Mar 14, 2003*		vs. No. 6 Oklahoma; Semifinals	L 59–74	20–11	American Airlines Center; Dallas, Texas
NCAA Tournament
Mar 21, 2003*	(10 S)	vs. (7 S) Michigan State; First round	L 64–79	20–12	St. Pete Times Forum; Tampa, Florida
*Non-conference game. ^{#}Rankings from AP Poll. (#) Tournament seedings in parentheses. S=South. All times are in Mountain Time.
