= Ricardo Patton =

American college basketball coach (born 1958)

Biographical details
- Born: October 23, 1958 (age 68)

Playing career
- 1976–1980: Belmont

Coaching career (HC unless noted)
- 1985–1986: Two Rivers MS
- 1986–1987: Hillwood HS
- 1988–1990: Middle Tennessee (assistant)
- 1990–1991: Arkansas–Little Rock (assistant)
- 1991–1993: Tennessee State (assistant)
- 1993–1996: Colorado (assistant)
- 1996–2007: Colorado
- 2007–2011: Northern Illinois
- 2011–2012: Maryland Eastern Shore (assistant)
- 2012–2016: Central HS
- 2016–2019: Denver (assistant)

Administrative career (AD unless noted)
- 2019–2020: Vanderbilt (senior advisor)

Head coaching record
- Overall: 219–243 (college)
- Tournaments: 1–2 (NCAA Division I); 1–4 (NIT)

Ricardo Maurice Patton (born October 23, 1958) is an American college basketball coach who most recently served as senior advisor to the head men's basketball coach at Vanderbilt University. On March 9, 2011, NIU announced that Patton would not return as their head coach for the 2011–12 season, it is unclear whether he resigned or was fired. Prior to this, he was the head coach at the University of Colorado. He was hired as head coach for the Buffaloes on March 5, 1996, just days before the Big Eight Conference Tournament. Patton guided the Buffaloes to six postseason appearances. On July 11, 2011 it was announced that Patton joined the University of Maryland Eastern Shore as an assistant coach.

Patton left UMES to become head coach at Central High School in Memphis, Tennessee. He became an assistant coach at the University of Denver in March 2016.

== Head coaching record ==
=== College ===
Record table
Season	Team	Overall	Conference	Standing	Postseason
Colorado Buffaloes (Big Eight Conference) (1996)
1995–96	Colorado	4–9	3–8	8th	
Colorado Buffaloes (Big 12 Conference) (1996–2007)
1996–97	Colorado	22–10	11–5	2nd	NCAA Division I second round
1997–98	Colorado	13–14	7–9	T–7th	
1998–99	Colorado	18–15	7–9	T–7th	NIT second round
1999–00	Colorado	18–14	7–9	7th	NIT first round
2000–01	Colorado	15–15	5–11	9th	
2001–02	Colorado	15–14	5–11	9th	
2002–03	Colorado	20–12	9–7	T–5th	NCAA Division I first round
2003–04	Colorado	18–11	10–6	4th	NIT first round
2004–05	Colorado	14–16	4–12	11th	
2005–06	Colorado	20–10	9–7	5th	NIT first round
2006–07	Colorado	7–20	3–13	12th	
Colorado:		184–160 (.535)	80–107 (.428)		
Northern Illinois Huskies (Mid-American Conference) (2007–2011)
2007–08	Northern Illinois	6–22	3–12	11th	
2008–09	Northern Illinois	10–19	5–11	T–11th	
2009–10	Northern Illinois	10–20	6–10	T–10th	
2010–11	Northern Illinois	9–21	5–11	T–10th	
Northern Illinois:		35–83 (.297)	19–44 (.302)		
Total:		219–243 (.474)			
