= Morgan State Bears basketball =

NCAA Division I basketball team in Baltimore, Maryland

| 2025–26 Morgan State Bears men's basketball team |
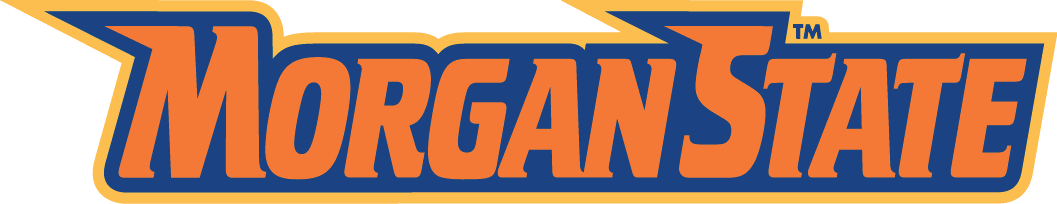
- University: Morgan State University
- Head coach: Kevin Broadus (7th season)
- Location: Baltimore, Maryland
- Arena: Hill Field House (capacity: 4,250)
- Conference: MEAC
- Nickname: Bears
- Colors: Blue and orange

NCAA Division I tournament champions
- 1974*
Other NCAA Division I tournament results
| Final Four | 1974* |
| Elite Eight | 1974* |
| Sweet Sixteen | 1974* |
| Appearances | 1974*, 1975*, 1976*, 2009, 2010 |

Conference tournament champions
- 1977, 2009, 2010

Conference regular-season champions
- 2008, 2009, 2010

Uniforms
| Home | Away |
- * at Division II level

The Morgan State Bears basketball team represents Morgan State University, located in Baltimore, Maryland, in Division I basketball competition. They currently compete in the Mid-Eastern Athletic Conference. The Bears are currently coached by Kevin Broadus and play their home games at the Talmadge L. Hill Field House. They were the 1974 NCAA Division II national champions. Morgan State has appeared two times in the NCAA tournament, most recently in 2010.

== History ==
The program hosted the first interracial American basketball game played south of the Mason–Dixon line on February 12, 1952, a 65–63 loss to Loyola College in Maryland.

== Post-season ==
=== NCAA Division I Tournament results ===
The Bears have appeared in two NCAA Division I Tournaments. Their combined record is 0–2.

| Year | Seed | Round | Opponent | Result |
|---|---|---|---|---|
| 2009 | 15 | First round | (2) Oklahoma | L 54–82 |
| 2010 | 15 | First round | (2) West Virginia | L 50–77 |

=== National Invitation Tournament results ===
The Bears have appeared in one National Invitation Tournament. Their combined record is 0–1.

| Year | Round | Opponent | Result |
|---|---|---|---|
| 2008 | First round | Virginia Tech | L 62–94 |

=== The Basketball Classic results ===
The Bears have appeared in The Basketball Classic one time. Their record is 0–1.

| Year | Round | Opponent | Result |
|---|---|---|---|
| 2022 | First round | Youngstown State | L 65-70 |

=== NCAA Division II Tournament results ===
The Bears have appeared in three NCAA Division II Tournaments. Their combined record is 6–3. They were national champions in 1974.

| Year | Round | Opponent | Result |
|---|---|---|---|
| 1974 | Regional semifinals Regional Finals; Elite Eight; Final Four; National Championship Game | Potsdam State; Hartwick; Bloomsburg; Assumption; Southwest Missouri State | W 54–43; W 68–64; W 71–57; W 73–70; W 67–52 |
| 1975 | Regional semifinals Regional 3rd-place game | Randolph-Macon; Baltimore | L 60–64; L 76–77 |
| 1976 | Regional semifinals Regional 3rd-place game | Baltimore; James Madison | L 65–85; W 86–81 |

== Notable former players ==
- Reggie Holmes *All-Time Leading Scorer, AP All-American
- Marvin Webster *3× MEAC Player of the Year (1973–1975)
- DeWayne Jackson *All-American
- Justin Black *2x First-Team All-MEAC, All-American
- Elijah Davis *Single Season Assist leader, Boxtorow HBCU All-American, Single season assist average per game, Second-Team All-MEAC.
