= Border War (Colorado State–Wyoming rivalry) =

College football rivalry between Colorado State and Wyoming

Football Border War
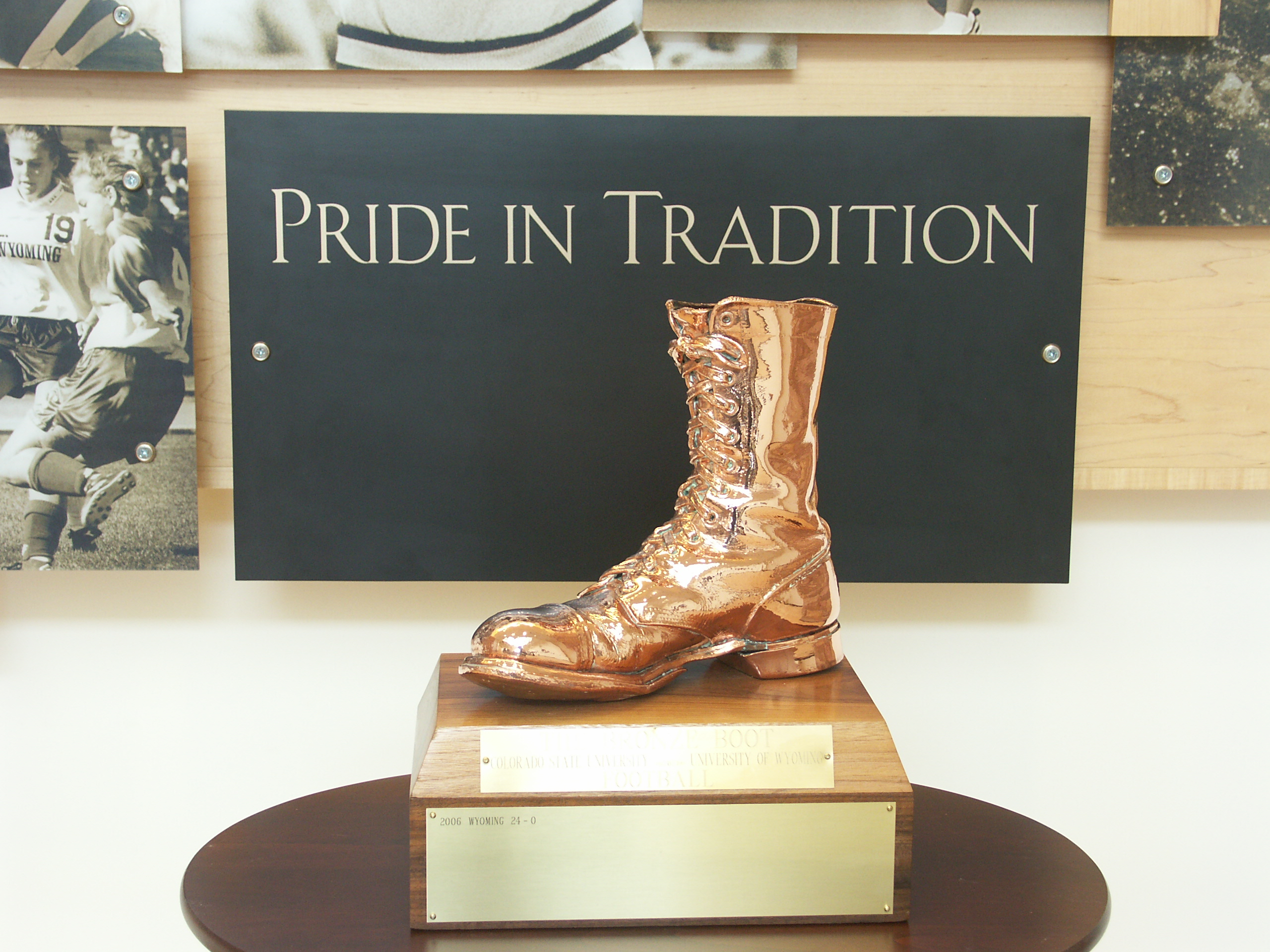
- The trophy of the Border War, the Bronze Boot

- Colorado State Rams Wyoming Cowboys
- Sport: Football
- First meeting: November 30, 1899; Colorado Agricultural, 12–0 (forfeit)
- Latest meeting: September 5, 2026; Colorado State, 35–13
- Next meeting: September 23, 2028
- Stadiums: Canvas Stadium; Fort Collins, Colorado, U.S. War Memorial Stadium; Laramie, Wyoming, U.S.
- Trophy: None (1899–1967); Bronze Boot (1968–present)

Statistics
- Total meetings: 118
- All-time series: Colorado State leads, 61–52–5
- Trophy series: Wyoming leads, 32–27
- Largest victory: Colorado Agricultural, 61–0 (1913)
- Longest win streak: Wyoming, 10 (1956–1965)
- Current win streak: Colorado State, 1 (2026–present)

Locations along U.S. Route 287.

The Border War is the name of a college rivalry between the athletic teams of the Colorado State University Rams and the University of Wyoming Cowboys/Cowgirls.

== Background ==
Colorado State University is a public university in Fort Collins, Colorado, and the University of Wyoming is a public university in Laramie, Wyoming. The two campuses are around 65 miles apart via U.S. Route 287. Both teams were inaugural members of the Mountain West Conference from 1999 until CSU left in 2026 for the Pac-12 Conference, and were previously both members of the Western Athletic Conference from 1968 to 1999.

== Football ==
The football rivalry between the two schools dates back to Thanksgiving Day, November 30, 1899. In the first ever matchup between the two schools and the first game that Colorado Agricultural (now known as Colorado State) ever played outside of Colorado, a disagreement between officials from the two schools resulted in a controversial ending to the game.

At the time, officials were provided by the schools competing in the game. The game concluded with a Wyoming forfeit being called after Colorado Agricultural official Edward House ruled that Wyoming official E.D. McArthur and the Wyoming team were refusing to abide by the rulebook. After the forfeit was called and the Colorado Agricultural players began leaving the field, official McArthur reportedly exclaimed that he "did not give a damn for the rules" and instructed the Wyoming team to run in a touchdown. This action reportedly set off a brawl between the teams. Following the game, Colorado Agricultural President Barton Aylesworth declared that his school would not play Wyoming in any athletic event until he received a written apology from Wyoming. The two schools played again the following year, and there has remained bad blood between the two programs since. The series is also the oldest and most-played in the Mountain West, and one of the most-played in the nation.

=== Bronze Boot ===
As the main component of the Border War rivalry, the football rivalry series revolves around the Bronze Boot, a traveling trophy awarded to the winner of the Colorado State–Wyoming football game each year.

In 1968, the ROTC detachments of the respective schools initiated the Bronze Boot. The boot was worn in the Vietnam War by Cpt. Dan J. Romero, an Adams State College graduate and Army ROTC instructor at CSU between 1967 and 1969. Each year leading up to the Colorado State–Wyoming game, the game ball is carried in a running shuttle relay by the ROTC detachment of the visiting team along US 287 to the Colorado–Wyoming border, where the home team's ROTC detachment receives it and runs the game ball to the stadium hosting the game. The trophy is guarded by the ROTC unit of the past year's winning school during the game.

=== Game results ===
Colorado State victories	Wyoming victories	Tie games

No.	Date	Location	Winning team		Losing team	
1	November 30, 1899†	Laramie	Colorado Agricultural	12	Wyoming	0
2	November 24, 1900	Fort Collins	Colorado Agricultural	16	Wyoming	0
3	November 14, 1903	Fort Collins	Colorado Agricultural	17	Wyoming	0
4	November 24, 1904	Laramie	Tie	6	Tie	6
5	November 25, 1905	Fort Collins	Colorado Agricultural	34	Wyoming	5
6	November 14, 1908	Laramie	Colorado Agricultural	20	Wyoming	0
7	October 16, 1909	Fort Collins	Colorado Agricultural	32	Wyoming	3
8	November 24, 1910	Laramie	Wyoming	10	Colorado Agricultural	0
9	November 30, 1911	Fort Collins	Wyoming	27	Colorado Agricultural	0
10	November 28, 1912	Laramie	Colorado Agricultural	33	Wyoming	0
11	November 27, 1913	Fort Collins	Colorado Agricultural	61	Wyoming	0
12	October 24, 1914	Laramie	Colorado Agricultural	48	Wyoming	10
13	November 6, 1915	Laramie	Colorado Agricultural	48	Wyoming	0
14	September 30, 1916	Fort Collins	Colorado Agricultural	40	Wyoming	0
15	October 6, 1917	Laramie	Wyoming	6	Colorado Agricultural	0
16	September 27, 1919	Laramie	Colorado Agricultural	28	Wyoming	0
17	October 4, 1919	Fort Collins	Colorado Agricultural	14	Wyoming	0
18	October 2, 1920	Laramie	Colorado Agricultural	13	Wyoming	0
19	October 16, 1920	Fort Collins	Colorado Agricultural	42	Wyoming	0
20	October 1, 1921	Fort Collins	Tie	7	Tie	7
21	October 14, 1922	Laramie	Colorado Agricultural	60	Wyoming	0
22	September 29, 1923	Fort Collins	Colorado Agricultural	33	Wyoming	0
23	November 26, 1925	Fort Collins	Colorado Agricultural	40	Wyoming	0
24	October 4, 1929	Laramie	Colorado Agricultural	20	Wyoming	7
25	November 8, 1930	Fort Collins	Wyoming	21	Colorado Agricultural	6
26	November 7, 1931	Laramie	Colorado Agricultural	26	Wyoming	6
27	November 24, 1932	Fort Collins	Colorado Agricultural	23	Wyoming	0
28	September 30, 1933	Laramie	Colorado Agricultural	7	Wyoming	0
29	November 3, 1934	Fort Collins	Colorado Agricultural	16	Wyoming	0
30	September 28, 1935	Laramie	Colorado A&M	12	Wyoming	3
31	October 17, 1936	Laramie	Tie	0	Tie	0
32	October 16, 1937	Fort Collins	Wyoming	7	Colorado A&M	0
33	October 1, 1938	Fort Collins	Tie	0	Tie	0
34	November 4, 1939	Fort Collins	Colorado A&M	22	Wyoming	0
35	October 5, 1940	Laramie	Tie	0	Tie	0
36	October 4, 1941	Fort Collins	Colorado A&M	27	Wyoming	0
37	September 26, 1942	Fort Collins	Colorado A&M	10	Wyoming	0
38	October 5, 1946	Laramie	Colorado A&M	7	Wyoming	0
39	November 22, 1947	Fort Collins	Colorado A&M	21	Wyoming	6
40	October 16, 1948	Laramie	Colorado A&M	21	Wyoming	20
41	October 1, 1949	Fort Collins	Wyoming	8	Colorado A&M	0
42	October 7, 1950	Laramie	Wyoming	34	Colorado A&M	0
43	October 13, 1951	Fort Collins	Colorado A&M	14	Wyoming	7
44	October 11, 1952	Laramie	Colorado A&M	14	Wyoming	0
45	October 10, 1953	Laramie	Wyoming	21	Colorado A&M	14
46	October 9, 1954	Fort Collins	Wyoming	34	Colorado A&M	0
47	October 8, 1955	Laramie	Colorado A&M	14	Wyoming	13
48	October 6, 1956	Fort Collins	Wyoming	20	Colorado A&M	12
49	October 12, 1957	Laramie	Wyoming	27	Colorado State	13
50	October 18, 1958	Fort Collins	Wyoming	7	Colorado State	6
51	October 10, 1959	Laramie	Wyoming	29	Colorado State	0
52	October 15, 1960	Fort Collins	Wyoming	40	Colorado State	8
53	October 14, 1961	Laramie	Wyoming	18	Colorado State	7
54	October 27, 1962	Fort Collins	Wyoming	28	Colorado State	7
55	October 12, 1963	Laramie	Wyoming	21	Colorado State	3
56	September 19, 1964	Laramie	Wyoming	31	Colorado State	7
57	September 25, 1965	Fort Collins	Wyoming	33	Colorado State	14
58	October 29, 1966	Fort Collins	Colorado State	12	#10 Wyoming	10
59	September 30, 1967	Laramie	Wyoming	13	Colorado State	10
60	November 2, 1968	Fort Collins	Wyoming	46	Colorado State	14

No.	Date	Location	Winning team		Losing team	
61	October 4, 1969	Laramie	#19 Wyoming	39	Colorado State	3
62	October 10, 1970	Fort Collins	Wyoming	16	Colorado State	6
63	October 2, 1971	Laramie	Wyoming	17	Colorado State	6
64	October 14, 1972	Fort Collins	Wyoming	28	Colorado State	9
65	October 20, 1973	Laramie	Wyoming	35	Colorado State	3
66	November 2, 1974	Fort Collins	Colorado State	11	Wyoming	6
67	October 4, 1975	Laramie	Colorado State	3	Wyoming	0
68	October 30, 1976	Fort Collins	Colorado State	19	Wyoming	16
69	October 29, 1977	Laramie	Wyoming	29	Colorado State	13
70	October 28, 1978	Fort Collins	Wyoming	13	Colorado State	3
71	September 29, 1979	Laramie	Colorado State	20	Wyoming	16
72	November 1, 1980	Fort Collins	Colorado State	28	Wyoming	25
73	October 31, 1981	Laramie	Wyoming	55	Colorado State	21
74	September 11, 1982	Fort Collins	Colorado State	9	Wyoming	3
75	November 19, 1983	Laramie	Wyoming	42	Colorado State	17
76	October 27, 1984	Fort Collins	Wyoming	43	Colorado State	34
77	October 26, 1985	Laramie	Colorado State	30	Wyoming	19
78	October 25, 1986	Fort Collins	Colorado State	20	Wyoming	15
79	October 31, 1987	Laramie	Wyoming	20	Colorado State	15
80	October 29, 1988	Fort Collins	#10 Wyoming	48	Colorado State	14
81	November 4, 1989	Laramie	Wyoming	56	Colorado State	35
82	November 3, 1990	Fort Collins	Colorado State	17	#19 Wyoming	8
83	October 26, 1991	Laramie	Wyoming	35	Colorado State	28
84	October 24, 1992	Fort Collins	Wyoming	31	Colorado State	14
85	November 20, 1993	Laramie	Colorado State	41	Wyoming	21
86	November 5, 1994	Fort Collins	#14 Colorado State	35	Wyoming	24
87	October 28, 1995	Laramie	Colorado State	31	Wyoming	24
88	November 16, 1996	Fort Collins	#23 Wyoming	25	Colorado State	24
89	October 18, 1997	Laramie	Colorado State	14	Wyoming	7
90	November 7, 1998	Fort Collins	Wyoming	27	Colorado State	19
91	October 23, 1999	Laramie	Colorado State	24	Wyoming	13
92	November 16, 2000	Fort Collins	Colorado State	37	Wyoming	13
93	September 29, 2001	Laramie	Colorado State	42	Wyoming	14
94	October 12, 2002	Fort Collins	Colorado State	44	Wyoming	36
95	November 1, 2003	Laramie	Wyoming	35	Colorado State	28
96	October 22, 2004	Fort Collins	Colorado State	30	Wyoming	7
97	October 22, 2005	Fort Collins	Colorado State	39	Wyoming	31
98	October 21, 2006	Laramie	Wyoming	24	Colorado State	0
99	November 23, 2007	Fort Collins	Colorado State	36	Wyoming	28
100	November 22, 2008	Laramie	Colorado State	31	Wyoming	20
101	November 27, 2009	Fort Collins	Wyoming	17	Colorado State	16
102	November 20, 2010	Laramie	Wyoming	44	Colorado State	0
103	December 3, 2011	Fort Collins	Wyoming	22	Colorado State	19
104	November 3, 2012	Laramie	Wyoming	45	Colorado State	31
105	October 19, 2013	Laramie	Colorado State	52	Wyoming	22
106	October 25, 2014	Fort Collins	Colorado State	45	Wyoming	31
107	November 7, 2015	Laramie	Colorado State	26	Wyoming	7
108	October 1, 2016	Fort Collins	Wyoming	38	Colorado State	17
109	November 4, 2017	Laramie	Wyoming	16	Colorado State	13
110	October 26, 2018	Fort Collins	Wyoming	34	Colorado State	21
111	November 22, 2019	Laramie	Wyoming	17	Colorado State	7
112	November 5, 2020	Fort Collins	Colorado State	34	Wyoming	24
113	November 6, 2021	Laramie	Wyoming	31	Colorado State	17
114	November 12, 2022	Fort Collins	Wyoming	14	Colorado State	13
115	November 3, 2023	Laramie	Wyoming	24	Colorado State	15
116	November 15, 2024	Fort Collins	Colorado State	24	Wyoming	10
117	October 25, 2025	Laramie	Wyoming	28	Colorado State	0
118	September 5, 2026	Fort Collins	Colorado State	35	Wyoming	13
Series: Colorado State leads 61–52–5

† = This game is controversial, but was ruled as a Wyoming forfeit per rule.

== Men's basketball ==
Basketball Border War
- Colorado State Rams Wyoming Cowboys
- Sport: Men's Basketball
- First meeting: January 27, 1911; Colorado Agricultural 19, Wyoming 17
- Latest meeting: February 14, 2026; Colorado State 79, Wyoming 68
- Stadiums: Moby Arena; Fort Collins, Colorado, U.S. Arena-Auditorium; Laramie, Wyoming, U.S.

Statistics
- Total meetings: 245
- All-time series: Wyoming leads, 139–106
- Largest victory: Colorado State, 83–48 (February 23, 2019) 35 point difference
- Longest win streak: Wyoming, 31 (1940–1951)
- Current win streak: Colorado State, 1 (2026–present)

The "Border War" between Colorado State and Wyoming also extends to men's basketball. The ESPN College Basketball Encyclopedia considers Colorado State to be Wyoming's "fiercest rival". Wyoming leads the series 138–105 over Colorado State as of 2025.

=== Notable men's basketball games ===
- January 27, 1951: Colorado State beat AP No. 20 Wyoming 62–38.
- February 14, 1987: Wyoming won 81–78 in triple overtime. Wyoming's Reggie Fox made a tying three pointer to force the second overtime, and Turk Boyd also hit a three to force the third overtime. The ESPN College Basketball Encyclopedia considers this the greatest Border War game of all time.
- January 23, 1988: Colorado State upset AP No. 17 Wyoming 54–49.
- March 11, 1988: No. 14 Wyoming beat Colorado State 60–58 in the WAC men's basketball tournament semifinal and would eventually become tournament champions. With two seconds left and the game tied at 58, Eric Leckner caught a three-quarter-court-length inbounds pass at the top of the key, turned, and made a 19-foot buzzer-beating jumper falling down, to win the game for Wyoming.
- March 9, 2000: In both schools' first seasons in the Mountain West Conference, Wyoming beat Colorado State 74–68 in quarterfinal round of the inaugural MWC basketball tournament, held at the Thomas & Mack Center in Las Vegas.
- March 13, 2003: In the quarterfinal round of the MWC tournament, No. 6 seed Colorado State beat No. 3 Wyoming 74–71. Colorado State would go on to win the tournament and a berth in the NCAA tournament.
- March 6, 2013: Colorado State won at Laramie, 78–56. However, this game became controversial because Wyoming students chanted "alcoholic" at Colorado State coach Larry Eustachy, a recovering alcoholic. At the game, fliers created by interns at the Wyoming athletics marketing office were distributed and made light of an infamous 2003 photo showing Eustachy, then the head coach at Iowa State, partying with University of Missouri students after the Missouri Tigers beat Iowa State. Wyoming's athletic director apologized for the students' behavior.
- January 31, 2018: 14–7 (5–3 conf) Wyoming beat 10–13 (3–7 conf) Colorado State 91–86 in double overtime in Fort Collins. The Rams had two players record double-doubles — Deion James, who recorded 24 points and 14 rebounds and Nico Carvacho, who recorded 10 points and 13 rebounds. Hayden Dalton led Wyoming with 26 points.
- February 23, 2019: Colorado State won in Fort Collins, beating Wyoming 83–48. The 35 point differential became the largest margin of victory in the history of the Border War series.
- January 31, 2022: 16–2 (6–2 conf) Colorado State traveled north to Laramie to take on 16–3 (5–1 conf) Wyoming on January 31, 2022. Regulation ended with the Rams and Cowboys tied at 70, and the Cowboys outscored the Rams 14–8 in overtime to hand the Rams their first back-to-back loss of the season. David Roddy led the Rams in scoring with 23 points before fouling out in overtime. Roddy made 9 of 15 shots — including 4 of 5 three-pointers — but struggled at the free-throw line, missing 2 of 3 shots including one that would've won the game at the end of regulation. Hunter Maldonado led scoring for the Cowboys by recording a new career-high 35 points, which marked the second consecutive game where the Rams allowed an opposing player to set a new career-high. Graham Ike recorded 16 points and 8 rebounds for the Cowboys before fouling out in overtime along with Roddy.

=== Game results ===
Rankings are from the AP Poll. Source for results:

Colorado State victories	Wyoming victories

No.	Date	Location	Winner	Score	Notes
1	January 27, 1911	Laramie	Colorado Agricultural	20–17	
2	February 18, 1911	Fort Collins	Colorado Agricultural	30–12	
3	January 26, 1912	Laramie	Colorado Agricultural	16–14	
4	February 21, 1912	Fort Collins	Colorado Agricultural	16–13	
5	January 18, 1913	Laramie	Colorado Agricultural	23–21	
6	February 19, 1913	Fort Collins	Colorado Agricultural	30–18	
7	January 25, 1914	Laramie	Colorado Agricultural	34–10	
8	January 31, 1914	Fort Collins	Colorado Agricultural	43–16	
9	January 16, 1915	Laramie	Colorado Agricultural	21–19	
10	February 13, 1915	Fort Collins	Colorado Agricultural	26–16	
11	January 17, 1916	Laramie	Colorado Agricultural	34–24	
12	February 20, 1916	Fort Collins	Wyoming	34–26	
13	March 2, 1916	Fort Collins	Colorado Agricultural	44–22	
14	January 19, 1917	Laramie	Colorado Agricultural	18–12	
15	January 20, 1917	Laramie	Colorado Agricultural	34–5	
16	February 11, 1917	Fort Collins	Colorado Agricultural	42–23	
17	January 19, 1918	Fort Collins	Colorado Agricultural	26–17	
18	January 24, 1919	Laramie	Wyoming	32–8	
19	January 25, 1919	Laramie	Wyoming	23–17	
20	January 17, 1920	Fort Collins	Wyoming	30–20	
21	February 6, 1920	Laramie	Wyoming	16–9	
22	February 11, 1921	Fort Collins	Colorado Agricultural	16–12	
23	February 12, 1921	Fort Collins	Wyoming	20–18	
24	February 10, 1922	Laramie	Wyoming	18–16^{OT}	
25	February 11, 1922	Laramie	Colorado Agricultural	19–8	
26	February 8, 1924	Fort Collins	Colorado Agricultural	29–16	
27	February 9, 1924	Fort Collins	Colorado Agricultural	28–21	
28	February 27, 1925	Laramie	Wyoming	32–15	
29	February 28, 1925	Laramie	Wyoming	43–10	
30	February 9, 1926	Laramie	Wyoming	34–14	
31	February 27, 1926	Fort Collins	Wyoming	36–23	
32	February 5, 1927	Fort Collins	Wyoming	37–31	
33	February 28, 1927	Laramie	Wyoming	34–25	
34	February 24, 1928	Laramie	Wyoming	53–22	
35	February 25, 1928	Laramie	Wyoming	60–31	
36	February 23, 1929	Laramie	Wyoming	53–39	
37	February 24, 1929	Laramie	Wyoming	44–34	
38	January 18, 1930	Laramie	Wyoming	46–28	
39	January 18, 1930	Laramie	Wyoming	56–36	
40	February 20, 1931	Laramie	Wyoming	43–41	
41	February 21, 1931	Laramie	Wyoming	46–22	
42	February 20, 1932	Fort Collins	Wyoming	34–28	
43	February 22, 1932	Fort Collins	Wyoming	30–25	
44	February 24, 1933	Laramie	Wyoming	57–28	
45	February 25, 1933	Laramie	Wyoming	56–38	
46	February 25, 1934	Fort Collins	Wyoming	41–15	
47	March 1, 1934	Fort Collins	Wyoming	39–21	
48	February 23, 1935	Laramie	Wyoming	26–20	
49	February 24, 1935	Laramie	Wyoming	34–32	
50	February 21, 1936	Fort Collins	Wyoming	34–24	
51	February 22, 1936	Fort Collins	Wyoming	31–21	
52	February 19, 1937	Laramie	Wyoming	33–32	
53	February 20, 1937	Laramie	Wyoming	31–27	
54	January 27, 1938	Laramie	Wyoming	45–30	
55	February 26, 1938	Fort Collins	Colorado A&M	46–37	
56	February 3, 1939	Fort Collins	Wyoming	35–30	
57	February 24, 1939	Laramie	Colorado A&M	46–45	
58	January 12, 1940	Laramie	Wyoming	39–35	
59	February 2, 1940	Laramie	Wyoming	53–40	
60	February 7, 1941	Fort Collins	Wyoming	40–34	
61	February 28, 1941	Laramie	Wyoming	44–27	
62	February 15, 1942	Laramie	Wyoming	61–37	
63	March 7, 1942	Fort Collins	Wyoming	45–43	
64	January 22, 1943	Fort Collins	Wyoming	66–42	
65	January 23, 1943	Laramie	Wyoming	49–23	
66	February 12, 1943	Laramie	Wyoming	57–34	
67	February 13, 1943	Fort Collins	Wyoming	65–40	
68	February 9, 1945	Fort Collins	Wyoming	43–32	
69	March 2, 1945	Laramie	Wyoming	45–32	
70	February 16, 1946	Laramie	Wyoming	64–43	
71	March 9, 1946	Fort Collins	Wyoming	55–41	
72	January 14, 1947	Laramie	Wyoming	60–30	
73	March 8, 1947	Fort Collins	Wyoming	52–38	
74	January 17, 1948	Fort Collins	Wyoming	52–34	
75	February 28, 1948	Laramie	Wyoming	62–37	
76	January 28, 1949	Fort Collins	Wyoming	56–39	
77	February 11, 1949	Laramie	#19 Wyoming	56–43	
78	February 12, 1949	Laramie	#19 Wyoming	39–29	
79	December 8, 1949	Denver	Wyoming	49–42	
80	January 3, 1950	Fort Collins	Wyoming	41–38	
81	January 20, 1950	Fort Collins	Wyoming	46–41	
82	January 21, 1950	Laramie	Wyoming	56–45	

No.	Date	Location	Winner	Score	Notes
83	March 7, 1950	Laramie	Wyoming	50–41	
84	December 28, 1950	Denver	Wyoming	62–50	
85	January 12, 1951	Fort Collins	#10 Wyoming	56–47	
86	January 13, 1951	Laramie	#10 Wyoming	77–58	
87	January 26, 1951	Laramie	#20 Wyoming	54–34	
88	January 27, 1951	Fort Collins	Colorado A&M	62–38	
89	January 31, 1952	Fort Collins	Wyoming	58–45	
90	March 5, 1952	Laramie	#16 Wyoming	89–57	
91	February 7, 1953	Laramie	Wyoming	71–52	
92	March 6, 1953	Fort Collins	Wyoming	54–53	
93	February 5, 1954	Fort Collins	Colorado A&M	47–43	
94	March 5, 1954	Laramie	Wyoming	52–44	
95	February 5, 1955	Fort Collins	Colorado A&M	55–49	
96	March 6, 1955	Laramie	Wyoming	69–46	
97	January 28, 1956	Fort Collins	Colorado A&M	66–56	
98	February 11, 1956	Laramie	Colorado A&M	66–56	
99	January 26, 1957	Fort Collins	Colorado A&M	64–49	
100	February 9, 1957	Laramie	Wyoming	65–56	
101	February 1, 1958	Fort Collins	Wyoming	67–61	
102	March 1, 1958	Laramie	Wyoming	70–62	
103	January 31, 1959	Fort Collins	Colorado State	78–60	
104	February 28, 1959	Fort Collins	Colorado State	80–74^{OT}	
105	January 30, 1960	Fort Collins	Colorado State	69–50	
106	February 27, 1960	Fort Collins	Colorado State	64–63	
107	January 28, 1961	Fort Collins	Colorado State	73–55	
108	February 25, 1961	Laramie	Colorado State	61–38	
109	January 26, 1962	Fort Collins	Colorado State	56–50	
110	February 24, 1962	Laramie	Colorado State	58–54	
111	January 4, 1963	Fort Collins	Colorado State	91–70	
112	January 12, 1963	Laramie	Colorado State	75–69	
113	February 7, 1964	Laramie	Colorado State	66–56	
114	February 9, 1964	Fort Collins	Colorado State	73–68	
115	January 23, 1965	Laramie	Wyoming	77–68	
116	February 6, 1965	Fort Collins	Colorado State	82–77	
117	December 4, 1965	Fort Collins	Colorado State	75–69	
118	January 22, 1966	Fort Collins	Wyoming	70–55	
119	February 12, 1966	Fort Collins	Colorado State	75–68	
120	January 14, 1967	Laramie	Wyoming	75–72^{OT}	
121	February 11, 1967	Fort Collins	Colorado State	69–57	
122	January 26, 1968	Fort Collins	Wyoming	84–68	
123	February 10, 1968	Laramie	Wyoming	74–67	
124	January 25, 1969	Laramie	Colorado State	78–68	
125	January 31, 1969	Fort Collins	Wyoming	76–74	
126	January 15, 1970	Fort Collins	Wyoming	88–87	
127	January 17, 1970	Laramie	Wyoming	79–77	
128	January 23, 1971	Fort Collins	Colorado State	74–51	
129	February 6, 1971	Laramie	Colorado State	88–78	
130	January 22, 1972	Laramie	Colorado State	68–66	
131	February 5, 1972	Fort Collins	Colorado State	80–70	
132	January 20, 1973	Fort Collins	Colorado State	61–59	
133	February 17, 1973	Laramie	Colorado State	60–54	
134	January 19, 1974	Laramie	Colorado State	57–46	
135	February 16, 1974	Fort Collins	Colorado State	76–67	
136	January 18, 1975	Fort Collins	Colorado State	78–60	
137	February 22, 1975	Laramie	Wyoming	65–61	
138	January 24, 1976	Laramie	Colorado State	51–41	
139	February 21, 1976	Fort Collins	Colorado State	61–57	
140	January 22, 1977	Fort Collins	Wyoming	74–64^{OT}	
141	February 19, 1977	Laramie	Wyoming	65–63	
142	January 21, 1978	Laramie	Colorado State	79–63	
143	February 18, 1978	Fort Collins	Colorado State	82–70	
144	February 2, 1979	Fort Collins	Colorado State	45–42	
145	March 3, 1979	Laramie	Wyoming	70–65	
146	March 1, 1980	Fort Collins	Colorado State	51–49	
147	March 3, 1980	Fort Collins	Wyoming	67–64^{OT}	
148	January 17, 1981	Fort Collins	Wyoming	85–54	
149	February 21, 1981	Laramie	Wyoming	68–40	
150	January 2, 1982	Laramie	Wyoming	51–31	
151	February 27, 1982	Fort Collins	Wyoming	63–57	
152	February 5, 1983	Fort Collins	Colorado State	50–48	
153	March 10, 1983	Laramie	Wyoming	49–39	
154	January 14, 1984	Fort Collins	Wyoming	69–63	
155	February 9, 1984	Laramie	Wyoming	67–51	
156	March 7, 1984	Laramie	Wyoming	40–36	WAC quarterfinal
157	January 31, 1985	Laramie	Wyoming	54–53	
158	February 22, 1985	Fort Collins	Colorado State	83–68	
159	February 1, 1986	Fort Collins	Wyoming	68–66	
160	February 22, 1986	Laramie	Wyoming	77–70	
161	January 6, 1987	Laramie	Colorado State	74–71	
162	February 14, 1987	Fort Collins	Wyoming	81–78^{3 OT}	
163	January 23, 1988	Fort Collins	Colorado State	54–49	
164	February 20, 1988	Laramie	#19 Wyoming	57–50	

No.	Date	Location	Winner	Score	Notes
165	March 11, 1988	Fort Collins	#14 Wyoming	60–58	WAC semifinal
166	February 4, 1989	Fort Collins	Colorado State	58–48	
167	February 25, 1989	Laramie	Colorado State	62–59	
168	January 15, 1990	Laramie	Colorado State	65–57	
169	February 3, 1990	Fort Collins	Wyoming	71–67	
170	January 8, 1991	Fort Collins	Wyoming	75–63	
171	February 26, 1991	Laramie	Colorado State	71–68	
172	January 28, 1992	Fort Collins	Colorado State	68–67	
173	March 7, 1992	Laramie	Wyoming	83–65	
174	January 16, 1993	Fort Collins	Colorado State	92–77	
175	February 20, 1993	Laramie	Wyoming	77–66	
176	January 15, 1994	Laramie	Wyoming	73–58	
177	February 19, 1994	Fort Collins	Wyoming	74–72	
178	January 7, 1995	Fort Collins	Wyoming	70–69	
179	February 25, 1995	Laramie	Wyoming	80–73	
180	January 10, 1996	Laramie	Colorado State	68–63	
181	February 24, 1996	Fort Collins	Colorado State	80–66	
182	January 11, 1997	Fort Collins	Colorado State	78–71	
183	February 6, 1997	Laramie	Wyoming	67–65^{OT}	
184	January 24, 1998	Laramie	Colorado State	53–46	
185	February 21, 1998	Fort Collins	Wyoming	69–64^{OT}	
186	January 23, 1999	Fort Collins	Colorado State	91–83	
187	February 20, 1999	Laramie	Colorado State	80–75	
188	January 15, 2000	Laramie	Colorado State	77–71	
189	March 4, 2000	Fort Collins	Colorado State	79–78	
190	March 9, 2000	Las Vegas	Wyoming	74–68	MWC quarterfinal
191	January 13, 2001	Fort Collins	Wyoming	70–69^{OT}	
192	February 10, 2001	Laramie	Wyoming	72–70	
193	January 12, 2002	Laramie	Wyoming	95–72	
194	February 9, 2002	Fort Collins	Wyoming	72–69^{OT}	
195	January 25, 2003	Fort Collins	Wyoming	79–77	
196	February 22, 2003	Laramie	Wyoming	62–60	
197	March 13, 2003	Las Vegas	Colorado State	74–71	MWC quarterfinal
198	January 31, 2004	Fort Collins	Colorado State	75–74^{OT}	
199	February 28, 2004	Laramie	Wyoming	67–61	
200	January 29, 2005	Laramie	Wyoming	69–56	
201	February 26, 2005	Fort Collins	Colorado State	96–94^{OT}	
202	January 25, 2006	Fort Collins	Wyoming	72–67	
203	February 25, 2006	Laramie	Colorado State	80–78	
204	January 24, 2007	Laramie	Wyoming	75–70	
205	February 24, 2007	Fort Collins	Colorado State	86–68	
206	January 26, 2008	Laramie	Wyoming	73–58	
207	February 27, 2008	Fort Collins	Wyoming	77–67	
208	March 12, 2008	Las Vegas	Colorado State	68–63	MWC first round
209	January 24, 2009	Laramie	Wyoming	83–74	
210	February 25, 2009	Fort Collins	Wyoming	82–79	
211	January 6, 2010	Laramie	Colorado State	83–73	
212	February 6, 2010	Fort Collins	Colorado State	80–64	
213	January 4, 2011	Fort Collins	Colorado State	73–60	
214	February 5, 2011	Laramie	Colorado State	59–56	
215	January 21, 2012	Laramie	Wyoming	70–51	
216	February 18, 2012	Fort Collins	Colorado State	54–46	
217	February 2, 2013	Fort Collins	Colorado State	65–46	
218	March 6, 2013	Laramie	Colorado State	78–56	
219	February 22, 2014	Fort Collins	Colorado State	82–67	
220	March 8, 2014	Laramie	Wyoming	83–75	
221	January 7, 2015	Fort Collins	Wyoming	60–54	
222	February 4, 2015	Laramie	Wyoming	59–48	
223	January 30, 2016	Laramie	Wyoming	83–76	
224	February 20, 2016	Fort Collins	Wyoming	84–66	
225	February 15, 2017	Laramie	Colorado State	78–73	
226	March 1, 2017	Fort Collins	Colorado State	78–76	
227	January 13, 2018	Laramie	Colorado State	78–73	
228	January 31, 2018	Fort Collins	Wyoming	91–86^{2OT}	
229	February 9, 2019	Laramie	Wyoming	74–66	
230	February 23, 2019	Fort Collins	Colorado State	83–48	
231	January 4, 2020	Fort Collins	Colorado State	72–61	
232	February 15, 2020	Laramie	Colorado State	77–70	
233	March 4, 2020	Las Vegas	Wyoming	80–74	MWC First Round
234	February 4, 2021	Laramie	Colorado State	74–72	
235	February 6, 2021	Laramie	Colorado State	68–59	
236	January 31, 2022	Laramie	Wyoming	84–78^{OT}	
237	February 23, 2022	Fort Collins	Colorado State	61–55	
238	January 21, 2023	Laramie	Wyoming	58–57	
239	February 24, 2023	Fort Collins	Colorado State	84–71	
240	January 27, 2024	Laramie	Wyoming	79–76^{OT}	
241	March 2, 2024	Fort Collins	Colorado State	70–62	
242	January 18, 2025	Laramie	Colorado State	79–63	
243	February 15, 2025	Fort Collins	Colorado State	88–53	
244	January 31, 2026	Laramie	Wyoming	88–67	
245	February 14, 2026	Fort Collins	Colorado State	79–68	
Series: Wyoming leads 139–106

== Women's basketball ==
Women's Basketball Border War
- Colorado State Rams Wyoming Cowgirls
- Sport: Women's Basketball
- First meeting: 1973–1974; Wyoming 42, Colorado State 26
- Latest meeting: November 13, 2026; Wyoming 58, Colorado State 55
- Stadiums: Moby Arena; Fort Collins, Colorado, U.S. Arena-Auditorium; Laramie, Wyoming, U.S.

Statistics
- Total meetings: 119
- All-time series: Colorado State, 60–59
- Largest victory: Wyoming, 117–57 (February 29, 1992)
- Longest win streak: Colorado State, 12 (1998–2002)
- Current win streak: Wyoming, 1 (2026–present)

University of Wyoming records list two women's basketball games played against Colorado State University during the 1973–1974 season, prior to Colorado State's inaugural season. According to Colorado State records, the first game played against Wyoming was on January 29, 1975, in Laramie.

=== Game results ===
Source for results:

Colorado State victories	Wyoming victories

No.	Date	Location	Winner	Score
1	1973-1974	Fort Collins	Wyoming	42–26
2	1973-1974	Laramie	Wyoming	55–22
3	January 29, 1975	Laramie	Colorado State	65–52
4	March 1, 1975	Fort Collins	Colorado State	40–39
5	December 12, 1975	Fort Collins	Wyoming	50–40
6	February 21, 1976	Laramie	Colorado State	48–38
7	December 18, 1976	Laramie	Colorado State	70–58
8	February 12, 1977	Fort Collins	Wyoming	55–52
9	December 5, 1977	Laramie	Colorado State	88–75
10	February 25, 1978	Laramie	Wyoming	89–74
11	February 28, 1979	Fort Collins	Wyoming	74–62
12	December 15, 1979	Laramie	Wyoming	99–87
13	January 25, 1980	Laramie	Wyoming	93–83
14	February 23, 1980	Fort Collins	Wyoming	88–74
15	January 6, 1981	Laramie	Colorado State	78–73
16	January 17, 1981	Fort Collins	Colorado State	86–59
17	February 21, 1981	Laramie	Colorado State	69–54
18	January 2, 1982	Laramie	Wyoming	81–68
19	February 27, 1982	Fort Collins	Colorado State	63–62
20	February 5, 1983	Fort Collins	Colorado State	65–54
21	March 5, 1983	Laramie	Colorado State	85–65
22	January 28, 1984	Laramie	Colorado State	59–57
23	February 25, 1984	Fort Collins	Colorado State	66–55
24	February 2, 1985	Fort Collins	Colorado State	59–57
25	March 2, 1985	Laramie	Colorado State	51–47
26	February 2, 1986	Fort Collins	Colorado State	68–64
27	March 1, 1986	Laramie	Wyoming	73–64
28	January 27, 1987	Laramie	Wyoming	57–49
29	February 21, 1987	Fort Collins	Wyoming	77–59
30	January 30, 1988	Fort Collins	Colorado State	60–51
31	March 5, 1988	Laramie	Wyoming	61–45
32	February 11, 1989	Fort Collins	Colorado State	63–53
33	February 25, 1989	Laramie	Wyoming	73–56
34	February 3, 1990	Fort Collins	Wyoming	63–54
35	February 17, 1990	Laramie	Wyoming	81–76
36	March 8, 1990		Wyoming	78–65
37	January 19, 1991	Laramie	Wyoming	70–52
38	February 16, 1991	Fort Collins	Wyoming	71–64
39	February 1, 1992	Fort Collins	Wyoming	78–60
40	February 29, 1992	Laramie	Wyoming	117–57

No.	Date	Location	Winner	Score
41	January 16, 1993	Laramie	Wyoming	83–69
42	February 13, 1993	Fort Collins	Colorado State	70–58
43	February 19, 1994	Laramie	Wyoming	82–78
44	March 5, 1994	Fort Collins	Wyoming	70–67
45	January 20, 1995	Laramie	Colorado State	59–52
46	March 2, 1995	Laramie	Wyoming	71–61
47	January 20, 1996	Laramie	Colorado State	83–66
48	March 1, 1996	Fort Collins	Colorado State	76–59
49	January 11, 1997	Laramie	Colorado State	75–61
50	February 6, 1997	Fort Collins	Wyoming	66–65
51	January 24, 1998	Fort Collins	Colorado State	99–67
52	February 19, 1998	Laramie	Colorado State	62–43
53	January 23, 1999	Laramie	Colorado State	93–67
54	February 20, 1999	Fort Collins	Colorado State	101–68
55	January 15, 2000	Fort Collins	Colorado State	86–69
56	February 11, 2000	Laramie	Colorado State	89–48
57	March 8, 2000		Colorado State	79–57
58	January 13, 2001	Laramie	Colorado State	76–51
59	February 10, 2001	Fort Collins	Colorado State	69–49
60	March 7, 2001		Colorado State	70–59
61	January 25, 2002	Fort Collins	Colorado State	57–49
62	February 23, 2002	Laramie	Colorado State	64–62
63	February 1, 2003	Laramie	Wyoming	69–64
64	February 28, 2003	Fort Collins	Colorado State	73–51
65	March 12, 2003		Colorado State	59–56
66	March 23, 2003	Fort Collins	Colorado State	73–64
67	January 30, 2004	Laramie	Wyoming	58–53
68	February 27, 2004	Fort Collins	Colorado State	60–49
69	March 10, 2004		Wyoming	67–61
70	January 28, 2005	Fort Collins	Colorado State	61–51
71	February 24, 2005	Laramie	Wyoming	68–45
72	January 25, 2006	Laramie	Wyoming	87–80
73	February 25, 2006	Fort Collins	Wyoming	78–71
74	January 27, 2007	Fort Collins	Wyoming	78–66
75	February 25, 2007	Laramie	Wyoming	72–37
76	January 26, 2008	Fort Collins	Wyoming	68–55
77	February 27, 2008	Laramie	Wyoming	68–46
78	January 24, 2009	Fort Collins	Wyoming	64–61
79	February 25, 2009	Laramie	Wyoming	71–62
80	March 10, 2009		Colorado State	64–56

No.	Date	Location	Winner	Score
81	January 5, 2010	Fort Collins	Wyoming	64–61
82	February 6, 2010	Laramie	Wyoming	69–52
83	January 5, 2011	Laramie	Wyoming	83–43
84	February 5, 2011	Fort Collins	Wyoming	74–55
85	January 21, 2012	Fort Collins	Colorado State	62–58
86	February 18, 2012	Laramie	Wyoming	66–62
87	February 2, 2013	Laramie	Wyoming	82–67
88	March 6, 2013	Fort Collins	Wyoming	65–51
89	March 14, 2013		Wyoming	60–58
90	February 22, 2014	Laramie	Wyoming	75–49
91	March 7, 2014	Fort Collins	Colorado State	58–46
92	March 14, 2014		Colorado State	95–92
93	January 7, 2015	Laramie	Colorado State	58–55
94	February 4, 2015	Fort Collins	Colorado State	67–58
95	January 30, 2016	Fort Collins	Colorado State	63–42
96	February 20, 2016	Laramie	Colorado State	62–57
97	February 15, 2017	Fort Collins	Colorado State	61–54
98	February 28, 2017	Laramie	Wyoming	56–49
99	January 13, 2018	Fort Collins	Wyoming	53–49
100	January 31, 2018	Laramie	Colorado State	64–53
101	February 9, 2019	Fort Collins	Wyoming	60–49
102	February 23, 2019	Laramie	Wyoming	56–32
103	January 4, 2020	Laramie	Colorado State	56–49
104	February 15, 2020	Fort Collins	Wyoming	43–40
105	February 4, 2021	Fort Collins	Colorado State	69–61
106	February 6, 2021	Fort Collins	Colorado State	68–65
107	February 16, 2022	Fort Collins	Colorado State	56–45
108	March 2, 2022	Laramie	Wyoming	69–63
109	March 7, 2022	Las Vegas	Colorado State	51–38
110	February 4, 2023	Fort Collins	Colorado State	66–63
111	February 25, 2023	Laramie	Wyoming	76–60
112	March 7, 2023	Las Vegas	Wyoming	65–56
113	January 20, 2024	Laramie	Wyoming	67–63
114	February 17, 2024	Fort Collins	Colorado State	75–70
115	January 25, 2025	Laramie	Colorado State	61–56
116	March 1, 2025	Fort Collins	Wyoming	68–55
117	February 7, 2026	Fort Collins	Colorado State	83–54
118	February 21, 2026	Laramie	Colorado State	62–48
119	November 13, 2026	Fort Collins	Wyoming	58–55
Series: Colorado State leads 60–59

== See also ==
- List of NCAA college football rivalry games
- List of most-played college football series in NCAA Division I
