= 1999–2000 UNLV Runnin' Rebels basketball team =

American college basketball season

1999–2000 UNLV Rebels men's basketball

MWC tournament champions

NCAA tournament, first round
- Conference: Mountain West Conference
- Record: 23–8 (10–4 Mountain West)
- Head coach: Bill Bayno (5th season)
- Assistant coaches: Dave Rice (6th season); Max Good (1st season)
- Home arena: Thomas & Mack Center

1999–2000 Mountain West Conference men's basketball standings
	Conf.				Overall
Team	W		L	PCT	W		L	PCT
UNLV †	10	–	4	.714	23	–	8	.742
Utah	10	–	4	.714	23	–	9	.719
New Mexico	9	–	5	.643	18	–	14	.563
Colorado State	8	–	6	.571	18	–	12	.600
Wyoming	8	–	6	.571	19	–	12	.613
BYU	7	–	7	.500	22	–	11	.667
Air Force	4	–	10	.286	8	–	20	.286
San Diego State	0	–	14	.000	5	–	23	.179
† 2000 Mountain West tournament winner Rankings from AP Poll

The 1999–2000 UNLV Runnin' Rebels basketball team represented the University of Nevada, Las Vegas. The team was coached by Bill Bayno and played their home games at the Thomas & Mack Center on UNLV's main campus in Paradise, Nevada as a member of the Mountain West Conference. The Runnin' Rebels finished the season 23–8, 10–4 in MWC play. They won the 2000 Mountain West Conference men's basketball tournament to receive an automatic bid to the 2000 NCAA Division I men's basketball tournament, earning a No. 10 seed in the South Region. The Runnin' Rebels lost to No. 7 seed Tulsa in the opening round.

== Roster ==
1999–2000 UNLV Rebels men's basketball team
Players
Coaches

Pos.	#	Name	Height	Weight	Year	Previous school	Hometown
G	11	Mark Dickel	6 ft 2 in (1.88 m)	190 lb (86 kg)	Sr	Logan Park	Dunedin, New Zealand
C	34	Kaspars Kambala	6 ft 9 in (2.06 m)	265 lb (120 kg)	Jr	Homestead

Head coach

- Bill Bayno

Assistant coach(es)

Legend

- (C) Team captain
- (S) Suspended
- (I) Ineligible
- (W) Walk-on
- Injured
- Current redshirt

Roster

== Schedule and results ==
Date time, TV	Rank^{#}	Opponent^{#}	Result	Record	Site (attendance) city, state
Non-conference regular season
Nov 19, 1999*		Mississippi Valley State	W 99–73	1–0	Thomas & Mack Center (11,247); Paradise, Nevada
Nov 21, 1999*		Fairfield	W 92–68	2–0	Thomas & Mack Center (10,670); Paradise, Nevada
Nov 24, 1999*		Nevada	W 98–79	3–0	Thomas & Mack Center (11,729); Paradise, Nevada
Nov 28, 1999*		Georgetown	W 85–69	4–0	Thomas & Mack Center (12,426); Paradise, Nevada
Dec 3, 1999*		vs. Princeton	W 76–66	5–0	Charlotte Coliseum (8,000); Charlotte, North Carolina
Dec 4, 1999*		vs. No. 2 North Carolina	L 78–102	5–1	Charlotte Coliseum (12,289); Charlotte, North Carolina
Dec 15, 1999*		Austin Peay	W 87–66	6–1	Thomas & Mack Center (10,778); Paradise, Nevada
Dec 18, 1999*		No. 14 Oklahoma State	L 75–89	6–2	Thomas & Mack Center (12,693); Paradise, Nevada
Dec 21, 1999*		Cal Poly	W 104–82	7–2	Thomas & Mack Center (10,786); Paradise, Nevada
Dec 28, 1999*		Eastern Kentucky	W 87–80	8–2	Thomas & Mack Center (11,740); Paradise, Nevada
Jan 2, 2000*		at No. 3 Cincinnati	L 66–106	8–3	Myrl Shoemaker Center (13,176); Cincinnati, Ohio
Jan 4, 2000*		High Point	W 72–53	9–3	Thomas & Mack Center (10,563); Paradise, Nevada
MWC regular season
Jan 10, 2000		BYU	L 75–77	9–4 (0–1)	Thomas & Mack Center (12,597); Paradise, Nevada
Jan 15, 2000		at Air Force	W 98–73	10–4 (1–1)	Clune Arena (1,237); Colorado Springs, Colorado
Jan 17, 2000		at New Mexico	W 85–73	11–4 (2–1)	The Pit (16,771); Albuquerque, New Mexico
Jan 22, 2000		San Diego State	W 83–55	12–4 (3–1)	Thomas & Mack Center (11,924); Paradise, Nevada
Jan 29, 2000		at Colorado State	W 78–75	13–4 (4–1)	Moby Arena (5,208); Fort Collins, Colorado
Jan 31, 2000		at Wyoming	L 98–109	13–5 (4–2)	Arena-Auditorium (7,114); Laramie, Wyoming
Feb 5, 2000		No. 19 Utah	W 72–66	14–5 (5–2)	Thomas & Mack Center (16,629); Paradise, Nevada
Feb 10, 2000		at Colorado State	W 74–63	15–5 (6–2)	Thomas & Mack Center (11,455); Paradise, Nevada
Feb 12, 2000*		Wyoming	W 87–60	16–5 (7–2)	Thomas & Mack Center (12,851); Paradise, Nevada
Feb 19, 2000		at BYU	L 82–83	16–6 (7–3)	Marriott Center (17,432); Provo, Utah
Feb 21, 2000		at No. 25 Utah	L 52–96	16–7 (7–4)	Jon M. Huntsman Center (13,821); Salt Lake City, Utah
Feb 22, 2000*		Florida Atlantic	W 81–60	17–7	Thomas & Mack Center (10,614); Paradise, Nevada
Feb 26, 2000		at Air Force	W 84–61	18–7 (8–4)	Thomas & Mack Center (11,847); Paradise, Nevada
Mar 2, 2000		at San Diego State	W 85–64	19–7 (9–4)	Viejas Arena (2,764); San Diego, California
Mar 5, 2000		New Mexico	W 80–67	20–7 (10–4)	Thomas & Mack Center (12,223); Paradise, Nevada
MWC tournament
Mar 9, 2000*		San Diego State; Quarterfinals	W 77–72	21–7	Thomas & Mack Center (7,124); Paradise, Nevada
Mar 10, 2000*		Wyoming; Semifinals	W 97–92	22–7	Thomas & Mack Center (12,437); Paradise, Nevada
Mar 11, 2000*		BYU; Championship Game	W 79–56	23–7	Thomas & Mack Center (14,237); Paradise, Nevada
NCAA tournament
Mar 17, 2000*	(10 S)	vs. (7 S) No. 18 Tulsa; First Round	L 62–89	23–8	Bridgestone Arena (17,230); Nashville, Tennessee
*Non-conference game. ^{#}Rankings from AP poll/Coaches' Poll. (#) Tournament seedings in parentheses. S=South. All times are in Pacific Time.
