= NBA draft combine =

Basketball pre-draft event

The NBA draft combine is a multi-day showcase that takes place every May before the annual June NBA draft. At the combine, college basketball and professional basketball players are measured and take medical tests, get interviewed, perform various athletic tests and shooting drills, and play in five-on-five drills for an audience of National Basketball Association (NBA) coaches, general managers, and scouts. Athletes can attend by invitation only. An athlete's performance during the combine can affect perception, draft status, salary, and ultimately the player's career. Beginning in 2024, participation in the combine became mandatory for a player to be eligible for the draft.

The athletic tests include a standing vertical jump, maximum vertical jump, bench press, three-quarter-court sprint time, lane agility time, and modified event time. Physical measurements include height with shoes, height without shoes, wingspan, weight, standing reach, body fat, hand length, and hand width. The shooting tests include spot-up three-point field goals from various distances (high school, college, and NBA) depending on position, shooting off the dribble, and timed jump shots on the move. Although the NBA Draft Combine is the largest pre-draft gathering for testing and drills, international players can attend a separate Eurocamp at a later date. Parts of the combine are televised on ESPNU and ESPN2.

In 2013, Rudy Gobert set the Combine records for wingspan 7 feet 8.5 inches (2.35 m) and standing reach 9 feet 7 inches (2.92 m). Those records were later broken in 2018 by Mohamed Bamba, and then by Tacko Fall a year later. Fall also became the tallest participant in event history at 7 feet 7 inches (2.31 m). D. J. Stephens set the vertical leap record in 2013 at 46 inches (1.17 m). Combine results may or may not affect draft position, depending on certain results from it. Supposedly, medical test results caused Jared Sullinger to fall to No. 21 in 2012, while Kevin Durant was drafted No. 2 in 2007 despite not being able to do a single repetition on the 185-pound (84 kg) bench press. Durant is not alone; Jamal Crawford, Monta Ellis, T. J. Ford, and Luke Ridnour are among the zero-rep producers. The record was set at 27 reps by Jason Keep in 2003. In 2016, Tyler Ulis set the Combine record for being the lightest player to record his weight at the event, being set at 149 pounds. The heaviest players recorded at the Combine were Dexter Pittman back in 2010 and Isaac Haas in 2018, both of whom were set at 303 pounds.

The invitation list is determined by a vote of the member teams of the NBA. In 2013, 63 players were invited. 60 players were invited in 2014. The vast majority of players receiving invitations attend. In 2014, the top three candidates (Jabari Parker, Andrew Wiggins and Joel Embiid) declined invitations and a few others (such as Mitch McGary and Adreian Payne) declined after receiving them or at least declined full participation, but 59 participants were expected. Each team is allowed a maximum of 20 official interviews during the combine.

Beginning in 2010, a D-League elite mini-camp lasting two days preceded the Combine. Beginning in 2016, college players could enter the draft multiple times and participate in the combine and tryout with one NBA team per year. In 2019, the event was changed into the NBA G League Elite Camp, which became a three-day event showcasing both NBA draft hopefuls and elite NBA G League prospects. This event also allows a limited number of draft prospects a chance to transfer into the NBA Draft Combine after the NBA G League Elite Camp concludes.
