= Dave Rice (basketball) =

American basketball coach (born 1968)

Current position
- Title: Head coach
- Team: Salt Lake Community College
- Conference: Scenic West Athletic Conference

Biographical details
- Born: August 29, 1968 (age 58); Pomona, California, U.S.

Playing career
- 1987–1989: Mt. San Antonio CC
- 1989–1991: UNLV

Coaching career (HC unless noted)
- 1991–1992: UNLV (GA)
- 1993–1994: Chaffey CC (assistant)
- 1994–2004: UNLV (assistant)
- 2004–2005: Utah State (assistant)
- 2005–2011: BYU (associate HC)
- 2011–2016: UNLV
- 2016–2017: Nevada (assistant)
- 2017–2021: Washington (assistant)
- 2023–2024: California Baptist(assistant)
- 2024–present: Salt Lake Community College

Head coaching record
- Overall: 98–54
- Tournaments: 0–2 (NCAA Division I)

David Wayne Rice (born August 29, 1968) is an American college basketball coach for Salt Lake Community College. He is also the former head men's basketball coach at UNLV where he ranks as the program's third-winningest coach. He spent the 2016–2017 season as an assistant coach at the University of Nevada, Reno, and an assistant coach at the University of Washington for three seasons (2017–2021).

Rice has served as a Division I assistant coach for 22 seasons. His first 11 seasons as a college assistant he spent at UNLV with those teams tallying 205 wins during that time.

In his most recent 11 seasons as an assistant coach, Rice has worked at Utah State, BYU, Nevada and Washington. The cumulative record of those teams during those 11 years was 274-99 for a .735 winning percentage. Those 11 seasons culminated in eight trips to the NCAA Tournament, two berths in the NIT, and eight league championships - six regular season conference titles and two conference tournament titles. Those teams dominated in conference play with six first-place finishes, three second-place finishes and one sixth-place finish.

== Playing career ==
Rice played for legendary UNLV coach Jerry Tarkanian, part of the 1989-90 UNLV Runnin' Rebels squad that won the NCAA men's basketball championship. Rice was also a member of the 1990-91 UNLV Runnin' Rebels basketball team that went 34-1 and advanced to the 1991 Final Four. He earned his bachelor's degree from UNLV in 1991 and an MBA in 1993, and was a Rhodes scholar candidate.

== Coaching career ==
After graduating from UNLV, Rice began his coaching career as a graduate assistant coach for Jerry Tarkanian during the 1991–92 season. That team finished 26-2 and was #7 in the final AP poll.

=== Claremont High School ===
Rice spent the 1992-93 year as an assistant coach at Claremont High School for his father, Lowell Rice. Claremont High School finished 21-7 and won the Baseline League Championship.

=== Chaffey Community College ===
For the 1993–94 season, Rice became an assistant coach at Chaffey Community College. The 1993-94 Chaffey team finished with a 32–6 record and advanced to the California Community College Final Four.

=== UNLV (Assistant) ===
Rice returned to UNLV for the 1994–95 season as an assistant coach for Tim Grgurich. He spent 10 seasons at UNLV under head coaches Grgurich, Bill Bayno and Charlie Spoonhour. During that time UNLV made seven post-season appearances, won a Mountain West Conference regular season conference title (2000) and two conference tournament titles (WAC in 1998, MWC in 2000).

=== Utah State ===
Rice left UNLV for Stew Morill's staff at Utah State University when UNLV hired Lon Kruger. Rice spent 2004–05 at Utah State. The Aggies finished the season 24-8, won the Big West conference tournament and advanced to the NCAA Tournament.

=== Brigham Young University (BYU) ===
Rice became an assistant at BYU under Dave Rose in 2005. He was named Associate head coach at BYU in 2008. Rice spent six seasons at BYU. During that time, BYU won four regular season championships, made the NCAA Tournament five times and the National Invitational tournament once. The 2009-10 BYU team finished 30-6 and advanced to the Round of 32 in the NCAA Tournament. The 2010-11 BYU team finished 32-5 and advanced to the Sweet Sixteen. That team also featured Jimmer Fredette, who was the National Player of the Year. Rice left BYU after he was hired to replace Kruger at UNLV in 2011.

=== UNLV (head coach) ===
Dave Rice was the head coach at UNLV for four full seasons (2011–16). During that time, Rice compiled a 98–54 record, ranking him third all-time in wins at the school. Rice won 51 games his first two seasons which was the most in the first two seasons by a UNLV head coach. His Runnin' Rebels teams spent a total of 27 weeks in the Top 25. During his time at UNLV, Rice won 10 games against teams ranked in the Top 25. Marquee wins included a 90–80 victory over #1 North Carolina on Nov. 27, 2011 in the championship game of the Las Vegas Invitational, and #3 Arizona 71–67 on Dec. 23, 2014.

Rice also had two players selected in the first round of the NBA draft including the #1 overall pick in 2013, Anthony Bennett and the 2015 #17 pick, Rashad Vaughn.

In his time as UNLV head coach, Rice had seven players who moved on to play in the NBA.

In the 2015–16 season, UNLV started 7-1 including wins over ranked opponents, Indiana and Oregon. But after losing five of his last six games, and an 0–3 start to conference, Rice was forced to resign as the Runnin’ Rebels head coach on January 10, 2016, and was replaced by interim coach Todd Simon.

=== University of Nevada ===
Rice joined Eric Musselman's staff as an assistant coach at the University of Nevada on April 27, 2016.

Rice was instrumental in Nevada's 28-7 Mountain West Regular season championship as well as its Mountain West Conference tournament championship, catapulting it into the NCAA tournament. The Wolf Pack lost to #5 seed Iowa State in the first round, 84–73

=== University of Washington ===
Newly named Huskies head coach Mike Hopkins hired Rice as an assistant coach on April 4, 2017. During the 2017–18 season, Rice helped lead Washington to a 21-13 record including, 10–8 in Pac-12 play. The team beat three Top 25 ranked teams: #2 Kansas, #9 Arizona, and #25 Arizona State. The team far surpassed expectations being picked to finish 10th in the preseason, but instead finished sixth. The Huskies were selected for the National Invitational tournament making it to the second round before losing to St. Mary's 85-81.

During the 2018–19 season Rice helped lead Washington to a 27-9 record. The team was 15–3 in Pac-12 play and won the regular season conference championship by three games. The Huskies also advanced to the 2019 Pac-12 Conference men's basketball tournament in Las Vegas. The Huskies earned a berth in the NCAA Tournament as the ninth-seed in the Midwest Region. Washington won its first game of the NCAA Tournament upending the higher eighth-seed Utah State 78-61.

Washington was eliminated with an 81-59 loss to top-seeded North Carolina in the second round to end a their successful season.

=== Salt Lake Community College ===
On April 11, 2024, Rice was officially hired as the head basketball coach for Salt Lake Community College. He replaced Kyle Taylor, who left to become an assistant at Coastal Carolina.

== Dave Rice Foundation ==
Rice and his wife, Mindy, established the Dave Rice Foundation in the spring of 2012. The foundation is a non-profit organization dedicated to the education and support of health initiatives including developmental disorders such as Autism, and other charitable causes. It has awarded over $600,000 in grants to various Autism-related organizations in Southern Nevada.

== Head coaching record ==
Record table
| Season | Team | Overall | Conference | Standing | Postseason |
|---|---|---|---|---|---|
UNLV Runnin' Rebels (Mountain West Conference) (2011–2016)
| 2011–12 | UNLV | 26–9 | 9–5 | 3rd | NCAA Division I Round of 64 |
| 2012–13 | UNLV | 25–10 | 10–6 | 3rd | NCAA Division I Round of 64 |
| 2013–14 | UNLV | 20–13 | 10–8 | T–3rd | |
| 2014–15 | UNLV | 18–15 | 8–10 | 7th | |
| 2015–16 | UNLV | 9–7* | 0–3* | | |
| UNLV: | | 98–54 (.645) | 37–32 (.536) | *resigned on January 10, 2016 | |
| Total: | | 98–54 (.645) | | | |
