= 2002–03 Colorado State Rams men's basketball team =

American college basketball season

2002–03 Colorado State Rams men's basketball
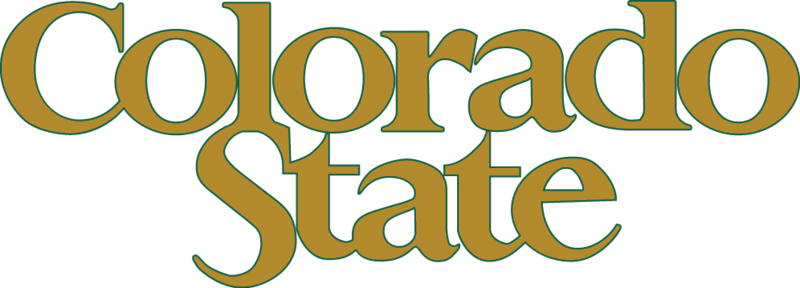

MWC tournament champions

NCAA tournament, First Round
- Conference: Mountain West Conference
- Record: 19–14 (5–9 Mountain West)
- Head coach: Dale Layer
- Home arena: Moby Arena

2002–03 Mountain West Conference men's basketball standings
	Conf.				Overall
Team	W		L	PCT	W		L	PCT
Utah	11	–	3	.786	25	–	8	.758
BYU	11	–	3	.786	23	–	9	.719
Wyoming	8	–	6	.571	21	–	11	.656
UNLV	8	–	6	.571	21	–	11	.656
San Diego State	6	–	8	.429	16	–	14	.533
Colorado State †	5	–	9	.357	19	–	14	.576
New Mexico	4	–	10	.286	10	–	18	.357
Air Force	3	–	11	.214	12	–	16	.429
† 2003 Mountain West tournament winner Rankings from AP Poll

The 2002–03 Colorado State Rams men's basketball team represented Colorado State University during the 2002–03 NCAA Division I men's basketball season. The team was coached by Dale Layer in his 1st season. They played their home games at the Moby Arena on Colorado State University's main campus in Fort Collins, Colorado and were a member of the Mountain West Conference. They finished with a record of 19–14 overall, 5–9 in Mountain West for a sixth-place finish. They went on to win the Mountain West tournament by defeating Wyoming, BYU, and UNLV. They received an automatic bid in the 2003 NCAA tournament as No. 14 seed in the West region. The Rams played tough, but were defeated by No. 3 seed Duke in the opening round.

== Roster ==
2002–03 Colorado State Rams men's basketball team
Players
Coaches

Pos.	#	Name	Height	Weight	Year	Previous school	Hometown
G	11	Andy Birley	6 ft 4 in (1.93 m)	200 lb (91 kg)	Sr		Vancouver, WA
G	32	Michael Morris	6 ft 4 in (1.93 m)	215 lb (98 kg)	Fr		Katy, TX
F	33	Brian Greene	6 ft 8 in (2.03 m)	225 lb (102 kg)	Sr		Thornton, CO
C	54	Matt Nelson	7 ft 1 in (2.16 m)	270 lb (122 kg)	So

Head coach

- Dale Layer (Eckerd)

Assistant coach(es)

Legend

- (C) Team captain
- (S) Suspended
- (I) Ineligible
- (W) Walk-on
- Injured
- Current redshirt

Roster

== Schedule and results ==
Date time, TV	Rank^{#}	Opponent^{#}	Result	Record	Site (attendance) city, state
Non-conference regular season
Nov 16, 2002*		Purdue-Fort Wayne	W 80–62	1–0	Moby Arena; Fort Collins, Colorado
Nov 27, 2002*		at Southern Illinois	L 71–83	4–1	SIU Arena; Carbondale, Illinois
Dec 14, 2002*		Washington State	W 90–79	8–2	Moby Arena; Fort Collins, Colorado
Dec 27, 2002*		Prairie View A&M	W 85–73	10–2	Moby Arena; Fort Collins, Colorado
Dec 30, 2002*		at Purdue	L 56–84	10–3	Mackey Arena; West Lafayette, Indiana
Jan 7, 2003*		at Colorado	L 72–93	11–4	Coors Events Center; Boulder, Colorado
Mountain West regular season
Jan 13, 2003		New Mexico	W 74–58	12–4 (1–0)	Moby Arena; Fort Collins, Colorado
Feb 8, 2003*		Utah	L 66–71	14–7 (3–3)	Moby Arena; Fort Collins, Colorado
MWC tournament
Mar 13, 2003*		vs. Wyoming; Quarterfinals	W 74–71	17–13	Thomas & Mack Center; Las Vegas, Nevada
Mar 14, 2003*		vs. BYU; Semifinals	W 86–80 ^{OT}	18–13	Thomas & Mack Center; Las Vegas, Nevada
Mar 15, 2003*		at UNLV; Championship game	W 62–61	19–13	Thomas & Mack Center; Las Vegas, Nevada
NCAA tournament
Mar 20, 2003*	(14 W)	vs. (3 W) No. 7 Duke; First round	L 57–67	19–14	Jon M. Huntsman Center; Salt Lake City, Utah
*Non-conference game. ^{#}Rankings from AP Poll. (#) Tournament seedings in parentheses. All times are in Mountain Time. (#) during NCAA Tournament is seed with Region W=West.
