= 1999–2000 Utah Utes men's basketball team =

American college basketball season

1999–2000 Utah Utes men's basketball

NCAA tournament, second round
- Conference: Mountain West Conference
- Record: 23–9 (10–4 MWC)
- Head coach: Rick Majerus (11th season)
- Home arena: Jon M. Huntsman Center

1999–2000 Mountain West Conference men's basketball standings
	Conf.				Overall
Team	W		L	PCT	W		L	PCT
UNLV †	10	–	4	.714	23	–	8	.742
Utah	10	–	4	.714	23	–	9	.719
New Mexico	9	–	5	.643	18	–	14	.563
Colorado State	8	–	6	.571	18	–	12	.600
Wyoming	8	–	6	.571	19	–	12	.613
BYU	7	–	7	.500	22	–	11	.667
Air Force	4	–	10	.286	8	–	20	.286
San Diego State	0	–	14	.000	5	–	23	.179
† 2000 Mountain West tournament winner Rankings from AP Poll

The 1999–2000 Utah Utes men's basketball team represented the University of Utah as a member of the Mountain West Conference during the 1999–2000 men's basketball season. Led by head coach Rick Majerus, the Utes finished with an overall record of 23–9 (10–4 WAC) and advanced to the second round of the NCAA tournament.

== Roster ==
1999–2000 Utah Utes men's basketball team
Players
Coaches

Pos.	#	Name	Height	Weight	Year	Hometown
PG	4	Isaac Taylor	6 ft 3 in (1.91 m)	200 lb (91 kg)	So	Arlington, Texas
F/C	13	Hanno Möttölä	6 ft 10 in (2.08 m)	250 lb (113 kg)	Sr	Helsinki, Finland
PG	14	Gary Colbert	6 ft 3 in (1.91 m)	180 lb (82 kg)	Fr	Etiwanda, California
SG	15	Nick Jacobson	6 ft 4 in (1.93 m)	206 lb (93 kg)	Fr	Fargo, North Dakota
SG	21	Trace Caton	6 ft 4 in (1.93 m)	211 lb (96 kg)	Jr	Alamosa, Colorado
F	31	Britton Johnsen	6 ft 10 in (2.08 m)	240 lb (109 kg)	Jr	Murray, Utah
G	35	Jeff Johnsen	6 ft 4 in (1.93 m)	200 lb (91 kg)	Sr	Murray, Utah
F/C	40	Phil Cullen	6 ft 9 in (2.06 m)	215 lb (98 kg)	So	Chelan, Washington
PG	41	Trent Whiting	6 ft 1 in (1.85 m)	187 lb (85 kg)	Jr	Kuna, Idaho
F	50	Alex Jensen	6 ft 7 in (2.01 m)	225 lb (102 kg)	Sr	Bountiful, Utah

Head coach

- Rick Majerus (Marquette)

Assistant coach(es)

Legend

- (C) Team captain
- (S) Suspended
- (I) Ineligible
- (W) Walk-on
- Injured
- Current redshirt

Roster

== Schedule and results ==
Date time, TV	Rank^{#}	Opponent^{#}	Result	Record	Site city, state
Non-conference regular season
Nov 16, 1999*	No. 16	Arkansas State	W 76–43	1–0	Jon M. Huntsman Center; Salt Lake City, Utah
Nov 19, 1999*	No. 16	at No. 14 Kentucky	L 48–56	1–1	Rupp Arena; Lexington, Kentucky
Nov 29, 1999*	No. 16	Stony Brook	W 74–45	2–1	Jon M. Huntsman Center; Salt Lake City, Utah
Dec 1, 1999*	No. 20	at Weber State	L 72–84	2–2	Dee Events Center; Ogden, Utah
Dec 3, 1999*	No. 20	Augusta State	W 69–56	3–2	Jon M. Huntsman Center; Salt Lake City, Utah
Dec 7, 1999*		Utah State	W 77–42	4–2	Jon M. Huntsman Center; Salt Lake City, Utah
Dec 11, 1999*		at Washington State	W 78–66	5–2	Friel Court; Pullman, Washington
Dec 17, 1999*		Sioux Falls	W 72–48	6–2	Jon M. Huntsman Center; Salt Lake City, Utah
Dec 18, 1999*		Chicago State	W 84–58	7–2	Jon M. Huntsman Center; Salt Lake City, Utah
Dec 22, 1999*		No. 14 Texas	W 79–73	8–2	Jon M. Huntsman Center; Salt Lake City, Utah
Dec 28, 1999*	No. 21	Oregon State	W 87–77	9–2	Jon M. Huntsman Center; Salt Lake City, Utah
Dec 30, 1999*	No. 21	Milwaukee	W 71–57	10–2	Jon M. Huntsman Center; Salt Lake City, Utah
Jan 1, 2000*	No. 21	Southern Utah	W 73–56	11–2	Jon M. Huntsman Center; Salt Lake City, Utah
Jan 6, 2000*	No. 18	at Louisville	L 55–75	11–3	Freedom Hall; Louisville, Kentucky
MWC Regular Season
Jan 10, 2000		at San Diego State	W 70–55	12–3 (1–0)	Viejas Arena; San Diego, California
Jan 15, 2000	No. 22	at BYU	W 56–49	13–3 (2–0)	Marriott Center; Provo, Utah
Jan 22, 2000	No. 19	Wyoming	W 69–61	14–3 (3–0)	Jon M. Huntsman Center; Salt Lake City, Utah
Jan 24, 2000	No. 19	Colorado State	W 76–70	15–3 (4–0)	Jon M. Huntsman Center; Salt Lake City, Utah
Jan 29, 2000	No. 19	at Air Force	W 64–63	16–3 (5–0)	Clune Arena; Colorado Springs, Colorado
Jan 31, 2000	No. 19	New Mexico	W 82–70	17–3 (6–0)	Jon M. Huntsman Center; Salt Lake City, Utah
Feb 5, 2000	No. 19	at UNLV	L 66–72	17–4 (6–1)	Thomas & Mack Center; Las Vegas, Nevada
Feb 10, 2000	No. 21	San Diego State	W 83–65	18–4 (7–1)	Jon M. Huntsman Center; Salt Lake City, Utah
Feb 12, 2000	No. 21	BYU	W 77–62	19–4 (8–1)	Jon M. Huntsman Center; Salt Lake City, Utah
Feb 19, 2000	No. 21	at New Mexico	L 65–72	19–5 (8–2)	The Pit; Albuquerque, New Mexico
Feb 21, 2000	No. 25	UNLV	W 96–52	20–5 (9–2)	Jon M. Huntsman Center; Salt Lake City, Utah
Feb 26, 2000	No. 25	at Colorado State	L 49–60	20–6 (9–3)	Moby Arena; Fort Collins, Colorado
Feb 28, 2000		at Wyoming	L 61–88	20–7 (9–4)	Arena-Auditorium; Laramie, Wyoming
Mar 4, 2000		Air Force	W 86–63	21–7 (10–4)	Jon M. Huntsman Center; Salt Lake City, Utah
MWC Tournament
Mar 9, 2000*	(2)	vs. (7) Air Force; Quarterfinals	W 74–65	22–7	Thomas & Mack Center; Paradise, Nevada
Mar 10, 2000*	(2)	vs. (6) BYU; Semifinals	L 54–58	22–8	Thomas & Mack Center; Paradise, Nevada
NCAA Tournament
Mar 16, 2000*	(8 MW)	vs. (9 MW) Saint Louis; First Round	W 48–45	23–8	CSU Convocation Center; Cleveland, Ohio
Mar 18, 2000*	(8 MW)	vs. (1 MW) No. 2 Michigan State; Second Round	L 61–73	23–9	CSU Convocation Center; Cleveland, Ohio
*Non-conference game. ^{#}Rankings from AP Poll. (#) Tournament seedings in parentheses. MW=Midwest.

== Team players in the 2000 NBA draft ==
Round	Pick	Player	NBA Club
2	40	Hanno Möttölä	Atlanta Hawks
