= 2003 West Coast Conference men's basketball tournament =

- Classification: Division I
- Season: 2002–03
- Teams: 8
- Site: Jenny Craig Pavilion; San Diego, California
- Champions: San Diego (1st title)
- Winning coach: Brad Holland (1st title)
- MVP: Jason Keep (San Diego)
- Television: ESPN2, ESPN

2002–03 West Coast Conference men's basketball standings
	Conf.				Overall
Team	W		L	PCT	W		L	PCT
Gonzaga	12	–	2	.857	24	–	9	.727
San Diego †	10	–	4	.714	18	–	12	.600
San Francisco	9	–	5	.643	15	–	14	.517
Pepperdine	7	–	7	.500	15	–	13	.536
Saint Mary's	6	–	8	.429	15	–	15	.500
Portland	4	–	10	.286	11	–	17	.393
Loyola Marymount	4	–	10	.286	11	–	20	.355
Santa Clara	4	–	10	.286	13	–	15	.464
† 2003 WCC tournament winner Rankings from AP Poll

The 2003 West Coast Conference men's basketball tournament took place March 7–10, 2003. All rounds were held in San Diego, California at the Jenny Craig Pavilion. The semifinals were televised by ESPN2. The West Coast Conference Championship Game was televised by ESPN.

The San Diego Toreros earned their first WCC Tournament title and an automatic bid to the 2003 NCAA tournament. Jason Keep of San Diego was named Tournament MVP.

== Bracket ==
First round Friday, March 7
5	Saint Mary's	65
8	Santa Clara	51
6	Loyola Marymount	65
7	Portland	63

Quarter finals Saturday, March 8
4	Pepperdine	71
5	Saint Mary's	75
3	San Francisco	70
6	Loyola Marymount	56

Semi-finals; Sunday, March 9
1	Gonzaga	73
5	Saint Mary's	52
2	San Diego	72
3	San Francisco	63

Finals; Monday, March 10
1	Gonzaga	63
2	San Diego	72

== See also ==
- West Coast Conference
