= Brad Holland =

American basketball player

Personal information
- Born: December 6, 1956 (age 69) Billings, Montana, U.S.
- Listed height: 6 ft 2 in (1.88 m)
- Listed weight: 185 lb (84 kg)

Career information
- High school: Crescenta Valley (La Crescenta, California)
- College: UCLA (1975–1979)
- NBA draft: 1979: 1st round, 14th overall pick
- Drafted by: Los Angeles Lakers
- Playing career: 1979–1982
- Position: Shooting guard
- Number: 14, 15
- Coaching career: 1988–2010

Career history

Playing
- 1979–1981: Los Angeles Lakers
- 1981: Washington Bullets
- 1982: Milwaukee Bucks

Coaching
- 1988–1992: UCLA (assistant)
- 1992–1994: Cal State Fullerton
- 1994–2007: San Diego
- 2008–2010: UC Santa Barbara (assistant)

Career highlights
- As player: NBA champion (1980); First-team All-Pac-10 (1979); Third-team Parade All-American (1975); As coach: WCC tournament champion (2003); 2× WCC Coach of the Year (1999, 2000)
- Stats at NBA.com
- Stats at Basketball Reference

John Bradley Holland (born December 6, 1956) is an American former professional basketball player. He played for four years at UCLA (from 1975 to 1979). He was a member of the 1980 Los Angeles Lakers championship team. He was the University of San Diego head basketball coach until March 2007. On April 25, 2007, he was named as one of three finalists to become the new head coach of UC Riverside's men's basketball program, but lost out to Jim Wooldridge. Holland served as an assistant coach at UC Santa Barbara during the 2008–2009 and 2009–2010 seasons.

== Early years ==
Born in Billings, Montana, he was a basketball and football star at Crescenta Valley High School. As a junior, he led the basketball team to the quarterfinals of the CIF 4-A playoffs. As a senior, he averaged 34.9 points per game and scored more than 50 points in two contests.

== College career ==
Holland accepted a basketball scholarship from UCLA, and holds the distinction of being the last player recruited by coach John Wooden. As a freshman, he only started 7 games, but was part of a team that reached the Final Four in 1976.

As a sophomore, he struggled and started only eleven games, averaging 6.6 points, 2.0 assists and 1.2 rebounds. In the first round 87–79 victory against the University of Louisville in the NCAA tournament, he scored 16 points and helped guard talented freshman Darrell Griffith.

As a junior, he remained a reserve player, averaging 6.0 points, 1.4 assists and 0.6 rebounds.

As a senior, he became a full-time starter, averaging 17.5 points, 4.8 assists and had a .598 field goal percentage, the best ever for a Bruin guard. He averaged 18.3 points during the NCAA tournament. He also received honorable-mention All-American and second-team Academic All-American honors.

He became part of four Pac-10 championships from 1976 to 1979, two under coach Gene Bartow and two under coach Gary Cunningham. He graduated in 1979 from UCLA with a B.A. degree in Sociology.

== Professional career ==
Holland was selected by the Los Angeles Lakers in the first round (14th overall) of the 1979 NBA draft. As a rookie, he was a reserve player, contributing to clinch the 1980 championship, by scoring 8 points in the 123–107 decisive victory over the Philadelphia 76ers in Game 6 of the NBA Finals.

In the 1980–81 season, he was a role player, averaging 3.2 points, 0.6 assists and 0.7 rebounds. On August 5, 1981, he was traded along with forward Jim Chones, a 1982 second draft pick (#44-Mike Gibson and a 1983 first draft choice (#22-Randy Wittman), in exchange for the Washington Bullets not matching the offer sheet that free agent Mitch Kupchak signed with the Lakers on July 23. On December 26, he was released by the Bullets.

On April 16, 1982, he was signed as a free agent by the Milwaukee Bucks, to provide depth for an injured Quinn Buckner.

In September 1982, he was given permission from the Bucks to attend the Utah Jazz rookie-free agent camp, with the condition of receiving compensation if Holland decided to stay. On September 29, he opted to announce his retirement instead of reporting, because of pain in his knees after three knee operations. He later entered private business and worked as a broadcaster at Prime Ticket from 1985 to 1998.

== NBA career statistics ==
Legend
GP	Games played	GS	Games started	MPG	Minutes per game
FG%	Field goal percentage	3P%	3-point field goal percentage	FT%	Free throw percentage
RPG	Rebounds per game	APG	Assists per game	SPG	Steals per game
BPG	Blocks per game	PPG	Points per game	**Bold**	Career high
†	Won an NBA championship

=== Regular season ===
Year	Team	GP	GS	MPG	FG%	3P%	FT%	RPG	APG	SPG	BPG	PPG
1979–80†	Los Angeles	38	–	5.2	**.423**	.200	**.938**	0.4	0.6	0.4	0.0	2.8
1980–81	Los Angeles	**41**	–	7.2	**.423**	**.333**	.714	0.7	0.6	0.5	0.0	3.2
1981–82	Washington	13	**3**	**14.2**	.370	.000	.750	**1.0**	1.2	**0.8**	**0.1**	**4.4**
1981–82	Milwaukee	1	0	9.0	.000	.000	.000	0.0	**2.0**	0.0	0.0	0.0
Career		93	3	7.4	.403	.190	.746	0.6	0.7	0.5	0.0	3.2

=== Playoffs ===
Year	Team	GP	GS	MPG	FG%	3P%	FT%	RPG	APG	SPG	BPG	PPG
1979–80†	Los Angeles	**9**	–	**3.6**	.500	.000	**1.000**	**0.6**	0.3	**0.6**	0.0	1.6
1980–81	Los Angeles	1	–	1.0	.000	.000	.000	0.0	0.0	0.0	0.0	0.0
1981–82	Milwaukee	1	–	3.0	**1.000**	.000	.000	0.0	**1.0**	0.0	0.0	**2.0**
Career		11	–	3.3	.545	–	1.000	0.5	0.4	0.5	0.0	1.5

== Coaching career ==
=== Cal State Fullerton ===
In his first year at Cal State Fullerton Holland received rave reviews for turning around the CSUF basketball program. During the 1992–93 season, Holland's team finished 15–12, posting the school's first winning record since 1985 and going 10–8 in the Big West Conference.

Holland's 1993–94 team lost three players to season-ending injuries prior to the first game. They finished 8–19 overall, and 8th-place in the Big West. He left his post suddenly in September 1994, just two months before the start of the 1994–95 season. Several years after his departure from Fullerton, it surfaced that Holland was responsible for several NCAA violations, which resulted in the program being placed on probation for 4 years.

=== University of San Diego ===
He compiled a record of 200–176 in thirteen years as San Diego head coach. In only two years did San Diego finish with a record of below .500. Holland led the Toreros to the West Coast Conference championship in 2003, beating Gonzaga in the conference tournament on San Diego's home court. He was fired at the completion of the 2006–2007 season to be replaced by Gonzaga University assistant coach Bill Grier.

=== Coaching success ===
As a coach, Holland achieved WCC coach of the year for the 1998–99 season, while directing USD to an 18–9 record and second-place finish in the West Coast Conference race (9–5). Highlights for that team include an important win over Texas in the Torero Tip-off, and the team's upset over then No. 25-ranked Gonzaga 75–59.

In 1999–2000 , Holland earned the Toreros 20 wins and 10 WCC victories, the school's most since the 1987 season. The efforts earned Holland the WCC Coach of the Year by his peers for the second season in a row. The Toreros had won seven of their final ten games to finish strong again, a hallmark of Holland coached teams. The season was marked by WCC wins at Gonzaga (82–70) and at home over WCC champion Pepperdine (73–62). The Toreros ended at 10–2 at home, and were 9–7 on the road, including an excellent 5–2 WCC road mark.

CollegeInsider.com named Holland as the 2004–05 West Coast Conference Coach of the Year. Seniors Brandon Gay and Brice Vounang were both named to the NABC District 15 Second Team.

=== 2002–03 ===
In 2002–03, Holland managed to guide USD to an impressive 18–12 record, the 2003 West Coast Conference Basketball Championship title and its first trip to the NCAA tournament in sixteen years. As a 13 seed in the South region, San Diego lost in the first round to Stanford, 77–69.

=== 2005–06 ===
The 2005–06 season was Holland's 12th season at the helm of the USD's basketball program. He guided them to 108 victories over the past seven seasons including a personal-best 20 win season in 1999–2000. In the 2004–2005 season he directed the Toreros to a 16–13 mark, which finished them at 3rd in the West Coast Conference. It tallied its biggest turnaround in Division I Basketball for the wins with an addition of twelve victories. With the team's 69–61 home win over San Francisco on February 9, Holland became the program's all-winningest coach. Holland's USD career mark before the Saturday's game in 2005 was 163–149. This included two years at CS Fullerton, which makes his overall coaching record 186–180.

=== Holland's firing ===
Holland was subsequently fired at the end of the 2006–2007 season to be replaced by Gonzaga University's assistant coach, Bill Grier. This was a fairly controversial move by the Toreros because supporters pointed to the fact that Holland was the winningest coach in Toreros history and joined Jim Brovelli and Hank Egan in leading USD to the NCAA Tournament. He also was very supportive of the school's strict academic requirements and nearly every player he coached went on to graduate.

A lack of recent success was cited as the major reason for Holland's firing. Since the Toreros' trip to the 2003 NCAA Tournament, Holland's teams achieved little success beyond the occasional victory over cross-town rivals San Diego State University Aztecs, and wins in the West Coast Conference tournament. Because of this, student and city apathy in the program was growing and USD Athletic Director Ky Snyder believed it was best to refresh the program with Bill Grier, a coach from a successful rival program, Gonzaga University.

== Head coaching record ==
Record table
Season	Team	Overall	Conference	Standing	Postseason
Cal State Fullerton Titans (Big West Conference) (1992–1994)
1992–93	Cal State Fullerton	15–12	10–8	T–5th	
1993–94	Cal State Fullerton	8–19	6–12	T–9th	
Cal State Fullerton:		23–31 (.426)	16–20 (.444)		
San Diego Toreros (West Coast Conference) (1994–2007)
1994–95	San Diego	11–16	5–9	5th	
1995–96	San Diego	14–14	6–8	6th	
1996–97	San Diego	17–11	8–6	T–4th	
1997–98	San Diego	14–14	5–9	7th	
1998–99	San Diego	18–9	9–5	T–2nd	
1999–00	San Diego	20–9	10–4	3rd	
2000–01	San Diego	16–13	7–7	4th	
2001–02	San Diego	16–13	7–7	5th	
2002–03	San Diego	18–12	10–4	2nd	NCAA Division I First Round
2003–04	San Diego	4–26	1–13	8th	
2004–05	San Diego	16–13	7–7	T–3rd	
2005–06	San Diego	18–12	6–8	5th	
2006–07	San Diego	18–14	6–8	5th	
San Diego:		200–176 (.532)	87–95 (.478)		
Total:		223–207 (.519)			
National champion Postseason invitational champion Conference regular season champion Conference regular season and conference tournament champion Division regular season champion Division regular season and conference tournament champion Conference tournament champion
