= 2002–03 Utah Utes men's basketball team =

American college basketball season

2002–03 Utah Utes men's basketball

Mountain West regular season co-champions

NCAA tournament, second round
- Conference: Mountain West Conference
- Record: 25–8 (11–3 MWC)
- Head coach: Rick Majerus (14th season)
- Assistant coach: Kerry Rupp (3rd season)
- Home arena: Jon M. Huntsman Center

2002–03 Mountain West Conference men's basketball standings
	Conf.				Overall
Team	W		L	PCT	W		L	PCT
Utah	11	–	3	.786	25	–	8	.758
BYU	11	–	3	.786	23	–	9	.719
Wyoming	8	–	6	.571	21	–	11	.656
UNLV	8	–	6	.571	21	–	11	.656
San Diego State	6	–	8	.429	16	–	14	.533
Colorado State †	5	–	9	.357	19	–	14	.576
New Mexico	4	–	10	.286	10	–	18	.357
Air Force	3	–	11	.214	12	–	16	.429
† 2003 Mountain West tournament winner Rankings from AP Poll

The 2002–03 Utah Utes men's basketball team represented the University of Utah as a member of the Mountain West Conference during the 2002–03 men's basketball season. Led by head coach Rick Majerus, the Utes finished with an overall record of 25–8 (11–3 WAC) and advanced to the second round of the NCAA tournament.

== Roster ==
2002–03 Utah Utes men's basketball team
Players
Coaches

Pos.	#	Name	Height	Weight	Year	Hometown
SG	15	Nick Jacobson	6 ft 4 in (1.93 m)	206 lb (93 kg)	Jr	Fargo, North Dakota
F	31	Britton Johnsen	6 ft 10 in (2.08 m)	240 lb (109 kg)	Sr	Murray, Utah
C	54	Tim Frost	6 ft 10 in (2.08 m)	240 lb (109 kg)	Jr	Klamath Falls, Oregon

Head coach

- Rick Majerus (Marquette)

Assistant coach(es)

Legend

- (C) Team captain
- (S) Suspended
- (I) Ineligible
- (W) Walk-on
- Injured
- Current redshirt

Roster

== Schedule and results ==
Date time, TV	Rank^{#}	Opponent^{#}	Result	Record	Site city, state
Non-conference regular season
Nov 22, 2002*		Southern Utah	W 61–47	1–0	Jon M. Huntsman Center; Salt Lake City, Utah
Nov 25, 2002*; 9:00 p.m., ESPN2		vs. No. 20 Gonzaga; Maui Invitational Tournament – Quarterfinals	L 52–71	1–1	Lahaina Civic Center (2,500); Lahaina, Hawaii
Nov 26, 2002*		vs. UMass; Maui Invitational Tournament	W 69–53	2–1	Lahaina Civic Center; Lahaina, Hawaii
Nov 27, 2002*		vs. Arizona State; Maui Invitational Tournament	L 79–83 ^{OT}	2–2	Lahaina Civic Center; Lahaina, Hawaii
Dec 3, 2002*		Winthrop	W 72–42	3–2	Jon M. Huntsman Center; Salt Lake City, Utah
Dec 7, 2002*		Arizona State	W 78–55	4–2	Jon M. Huntsman Center; Salt Lake City, Utah
Dec 14, 2002*		Northern Iowa	W 75–53	5–2	Jon M. Huntsman Center; Salt Lake City, Utah
Dec 17, 2002*		at Utah State	L 54–59	5–3	Dee Glen Smith Spectrum; Logan, Utah
Dec 20, 2002*		at Pepperdine	W 77–61	6–3	Firestone Fieldhouse; Malibu, California
Dec 23, 2002*		at San Diego	W 64–58	7–3	Jenny Craig Pavilion; San Diego, California
Dec 30, 2002*		No. 1 Alabama	W 51–49	8–3	Jon M. Huntsman Center; Salt Lake City, Utah
Jan 3, 2003*		Weber State	W 72–58	9–3	Jon M. Huntsman Center; Salt Lake City, Utah
Jan 6, 2003*		Saint Mary's	W 65–59	10–3	Jon M. Huntsman Center; Salt Lake City, Utah
Jan 11, 2003*		Purdue-Fort Wayne	W 76–59	11–3	Jon M. Huntsman Center; Salt Lake City, Utah
Jan 14, 2003*		Ripon	W 75–59	12–3	Jon M. Huntsman Center; Salt Lake City, Utah
MWC Regular Season
Jan 18, 2003		at San Diego State	L 56–58	12–4 (0–1)	Viejas Arena; San Diego, California
Jan 20, 2003		at UNLV	W 66–63	13–4 (1–1)	Thomas & Mack Center; Las Vegas, Nevada
Jan 25, 2003		at BYU	W 79–75	14–4 (2–1)	Marriott Center; Provo, Utah
Feb 1, 2003		Air Force	W 45–35	15–4 (3–1)	Jon M. Huntsman Center; Salt Lake City, Utah
Feb 3, 2003		New Mexico	W 78–68	16–4 (4–1)	Jon M. Huntsman Center; Salt Lake City, Utah
Feb 8, 2003		at Colorado State	W 71–66	17–4 (5–1)	Moby Arena; Fort Collins, Colorado
Feb 10, 2003		at Wyoming	W 69–56	18–4 (6–1)	Arena-Auditorium; Laramie, Wyoming
Feb 15, 2003		San Diego State	W 76–62	19–4 (7–1)	Jon M. Huntsman Center; Salt Lake City, Utah
Feb 17, 2003	No. 23	UNLV	W 86–80 ^{OT}	20–4 (8–1)	Jon M. Huntsman Center; Salt Lake City, Utah
Feb 24, 2003	No. 22	BYU	W 71–64	21–4 (9–1)	Jon M. Huntsman Center; Salt Lake City, Utah
Mar 1, 2003	No. 22	at New Mexico	L 69–76	21–5 (9–2)	University Arena; Albuquerque, New Mexico
Mar 3, 2003		at Air Force	W 57–52	22–5 (10–2)	Clune Arena; Colorado Springs, Colorado
Mar 6, 2003		Colorado State	L 65–66	22–6 (10–3)	Jon M. Huntsman Center; Salt Lake City, Utah
Mar 8, 2003		Wyoming	W 86–70	23–6 (11–3)	Jon M. Huntsman Center; Salt Lake City, Utah
MWC Tournament
Mar 13, 2003*	(1)	vs. (8) Air Force; Quarterfinals	W 42–38	24–6	Thomas & Mack Center; Las Vegas, Nevada
Mar 14, 2003*	(1)	at (4) UNLV; Semifinals	L 41–64	24–7	Thomas & Mack Center; Las Vegas, Nevada
NCAA Tournament
Mar 21, 2003*	(9 MW)	vs. (8 MW) Oregon; Second Round	W 60–58	25–7	Bridgestone Arena; Nashville, Tennessee
Mar 23, 2003*	(9 MW)	vs. (1 MW) No. 1 Kentucky; Second Round	L 54–74	25–8	Bridgestone Arena; Nashville, Tennessee
*Non-conference game. ^{#}Rankings from AP Poll. (#) Tournament seedings in parentheses. MW=Midwest. All times are in Mountain Time.
