= 2002–03 San Diego Toreros men's basketball team =

American college basketball season

2002–03 San Diego Toreros men's basketball

West Coast Conference tournament champions

NCAA tournament
- Conference: West Coast Conference
- Record: 18–12 (10–4 WCC)
- Head coach: Brad Holland
- Home arena: Pacific Pavilion

2002–03 West Coast Conference men's basketball standings
	Conf.				Overall
Team	W		L	PCT	W		L	PCT
Gonzaga	12	–	2	.857	24	–	9	.727
San Diego †	10	–	4	.714	18	–	12	.600
San Francisco	9	–	5	.643	15	–	14	.517
Pepperdine	7	–	7	.500	15	–	13	.536
Saint Mary's	6	–	8	.429	15	–	15	.500
Portland	4	–	10	.286	11	–	17	.393
Loyola Marymount	4	–	10	.286	11	–	20	.355
Santa Clara	4	–	10	.286	13	–	15	.464
† 2003 WCC tournament winner Rankings from AP Poll

2002–03 San Diego Toreros men's basketball team represented University of San Diego during the 2002–03 men's college basketball season. They received the conference's automatic bid to the NCAA Tournament where they lost in the first round to Stanford.

== Schedule ==
Date time, TV	Rank^{#}	Opponent^{#}	Result	Record	Site city, state
Regular season
November 23*		Nevada	W 77–75	1–0	Jenny Craig Pavilion (1,120); San Diego, California
November 26*; FSNW2		at No. 14 UCLA	W 86–81 ^{OT}	2–0	Pauley Pavilion (6,845); Los Angeles, California
November 30*		at UC-Riverside	W 84–64	3–0	UCR Student Rec Center (1,462); Riverside, California
December 4*		Cal State Northridge	L 61–64	3–1	Jenny Craig Pavilion (2,313); San Diego, California
December 6*; 2:30 p.m.		vs. IUPUI; Boilermaker Invitational	W 81–74	4–1	Mackey Arena (10,088); West Lafayette, Indiana
December 7*; 5:00 p.m.		at Purdue; Boilermaker Invitational	L 65–95	4–2	Mackey Arena (10,109); West Lafayette, Indiana
December 11*		at BYU	L 49–64	4–3	Marriott Center (11,608); Provo, Utah
December 14*		UC-San Diego	W 105–62	5–3	Jenny Craig Pavilion (2,157); San Diego, California
December 21*		UC-Riverside	W 73–62	6–3	Jenny Craig Pavilion (1,753); San Diego, California
December 23*		Utah	L 58–64	6–4	Jenny Craig Pavilion (2,516); San Diego, California
December 28*		at Nevada	L 70–81	6–5	Lawlor Events Center (5,843); Reno, Nevada
January 2*		at SMU	L 82–88 ^{OT}	6–6	Moody Coliseum (2,989); University Park, Texas
January 8*		at San Diego State	L 72–78	6–7	Viejas Arena (8,078); San Diego, California
January 11		Santa Clara	L 65–67	6–8 (0–1)	Jenny Craig Pavilion (2,424); San Diego, California
January 11		at Loyola Marymount	W 82–68	7–8 (1–1)	Gersten Pavilion (1,751); Los Angeles, California
January 18		at Pepperdine	W 88–73	8–8 (2–1)	Firestone Fieldhouse (2,071); Malibu, California
January 25		San Francisco	W 74–69	9–8 (3–1)	Jenny Craig Pavilion (2,079); San Diego, California
January 30; 7:00 p.m., PAX		at Gonzaga	L 65–89	9–9 (3–2)	Charlotte Y. Martin Centre (4,000); Spokane, Washington
February 1		at Portland	W 78–77	10–9 (4–2)	Chiles Center (1,359); Portland, Oregon
February 5		Saint Mary's (CA)	W 76–69	11–9 (5–2)	Jenny Craig Pavilion (2,648); San Diego, California
February 8		at Santa Clara	W 78–66	12–9 (6–2)	Leavey Center (1,538); Santa Clara, California
February 13		Pepperdine	L 93–98	12–10 (6–3)	Jenny Craig Pavilion (2,645); San Diego, California
February 15		Loyola Marymount	W 73–51	13–10 (7–3)	Jenny Craig Pavilion (3,177); San Diego, California
February 21		at Saint Mary's (CA)	W 75–57	14–10 (8–3)	McKeon Pavilion (1,730); Moraga, California
February 22		at San Francisco	W 81–63	15–10 (9–3)	The Sobrato Center (3,977); San Francisco, California
February 27		Portland	W 92–69	16–10 (10–3)	Jenny Craig Pavilion (1,677); San Diego, California
March 1; 6:00 p.m., FOX Sports Northwest		Gonzaga	L 69–72	16–11 (10–4)	Jenny Craig Pavilion (5,178); San Diego, California
West Coast Conference tournament
March 9	(2)	(3) San Francisco; Semifinals	W 72–63	17–11 (10–4)	Jenny Craig Pavilion; San Diego, California
March 10; 8:00 p.m., ESPN	(2)	(1) Gonzaga; Championship	W 72–63	18–11 (10–4)	Jenny Craig Pavilion (5,391); San Diego, California
NCAA tournament
March 20*	(13 S)	vs. (4 S) No. 18 Stanford; First round	L 69–77	18–12 (10–4)	Spokane Veterans Memorial Arena (11,284); Spokane, Washington
*Non-conference game. ^{#}Rankings from AP poll. (#) Tournament seedings in parentheses. S=South. All times are in Pacific Time.
