= 2002–03 BYU Cougars men's basketball team =

American college basketball season

2002–03 BYU Cougars men's basketball

Mountain West regular season co-champions

NCAA tournament, first round
- Conference: Mountain West Conference
- Record: 23–9 (11–3 Mountain West)
- Head coach: Steve Cleveland (6th season)
- Home arena: Marriott Center

2002–03 Mountain West Conference men's basketball standings
	Conf.				Overall
Team	W		L	PCT	W		L	PCT
Utah	11	–	3	.786	25	–	8	.758
BYU	11	–	3	.786	23	–	9	.719
Wyoming	8	–	6	.571	21	–	11	.656
UNLV	8	–	6	.571	21	–	11	.656
San Diego State	6	–	8	.429	16	–	14	.533
Colorado State †	5	–	9	.357	19	–	14	.576
New Mexico	4	–	10	.286	10	–	18	.357
Air Force	3	–	11	.214	12	–	16	.429
† 2003 Mountain West tournament winner Rankings from AP Poll

The 2002–03 BYU Cougars men's basketball team represented Brigham Young University as a member of the Mountain West Conference during the 2002–03 season. Led by head coach Steve Cleveland, the Cougars earned their first Mountain West Conference championship. This was also their second of three NCAA Tournament appearances under Cleveland. BYU finished the season with a 23–9 record (11–3 MWC).

== Roster ==
2002–03 BYU Cougars men's basketball team
Players
Coaches

Pos.	#	Name	Height	Weight	Year	Hometown
G	2	Travis Hansen	6 ft 6 in (1.98 m)	210 lb (95 kg)	Sr	Orem, Utah
C	40	Dan Howard	7 ft 0 in (2.13 m)	225 lb (102 kg)	Jr	Kaysville, Utah
F	32	Bart Jepsen	6 ft 9 in (2.06 m)	235 lb (107 kg)	RS Sr	Roswell, New Mexico
C	55	Rafael Araújo	6 ft 11 in (2.11 m)	280 lb (127 kg)	Jr

Head coach

- Steve Cleveland

Assistant coach(es)

Legend

- (C) Team captain
- (S) Suspended
- (I) Ineligible
- (W) Walk-on
- Injured
- Current redshirt

Roster

== Schedule and results ==
Date time, TV	Rank^{#}	Opponent^{#}	Result	Record	Site city, state
Regular Season
Nov 22, 2002*		vs. Toledo	W 71–56	1–0	Virgin Islands Sport & Fitness Center
Nov 23, 2002*		vs. Kansas State	W 73–64	2–0	Virgin Islands Sport & Fitness Center
Nov 25, 2002*		vs. St. Bonaventure	W 66–57	3–0	Virgin Islands Sport & Fitness Center
Nov 30, 2002*		Rice	W 95–56	4–0	Marriott Center; Provo, Utah
Dec 4, 2002*		at Arizona State	W 64–60	5–0	Wells Fargo Arena; Tempe, Arizona
Dec 7, 2002*		at Creighton	L 64–74	5–1	Omaha Civic Auditorium; Omaha, Nebraska
Dec 11, 2002*		San Diego	W 64–49	6–1	Marriott Center; Provo, Utah
Dec 14, 2002*		Utah State	W 66–56	7–1	Marriott Center; Provo, Utah
Dec 21, 2002*		UC Santa Barbara	W 69–56	8–1	Marriott Center; Provo, Utah
Dec 23, 2002*		at San Francisco	L 72–84	8–2	War Memorial Gymnasium; San Francisco, California
Dec 28, 2002*		Southern Utah	W 93–60	9–2	Marriott Center; Provo, Utah
Jan 2, 2003*		Pepperdine	W 84–68	10–2	Marriott Center; Provo, Utah
Jan 4, 2003*		vs. Oklahoma State	L 65–78	10–3	Ford Center; Oklahoma City, Oklahoma
Jan 8, 2003*		at Weber State	L 69–75	10–4	Dee Events Center; Ogden, Utah
WAC tournament
Mar 13, 2003*		vs. New Mexico; Quarterfinals	W 71–56	23–7	Thomas & Mack Center; Las Vegas, Nevada
Mar 14, 2003*		vs. Colorado State; Semifinals	L 80–86 ^{OT}	23–8	Thomas & Mack Center; Las Vegas, Nevada
NCAA tournament
Mar 20, 2003*; CBS	(12 S)	vs. (5 S) No. 23 Connecticut; First round	L 53–58	23–9	Spokane Veterans Memorial Arena (11,284); Spokane, Washington
*Non-conference game. ^{#}Rankings from AP Poll. (#) Tournament seedings in parentheses. S=South.
