= 2002–03 Gonzaga Bulldogs men's basketball team =

American college basketball season

2002–03 Gonzaga Bulldogs men's basketball

WCC Regular Season Champions

NCAA tournament, Round of 32
- Conference: West Coast Conference
- Record: 24–9 (12–2 WCC)
- Head coach: Mark Few (4th season)
- Assistant coaches: Bill Grier (12th season); Leon Rice (4th season); Tommy Lloyd (2nd season)
- Home arena: Charlotte Y. Martin Centre

2002–03 West Coast Conference men's basketball standings
	Conf.				Overall
Team	W		L	PCT	W		L	PCT
Gonzaga	12	–	2	.857	24	–	9	.727
San Diego †	10	–	4	.714	18	–	12	.600
San Francisco	9	–	5	.643	15	–	14	.517
Pepperdine	7	–	7	.500	15	–	13	.536
Saint Mary's	6	–	8	.429	15	–	15	.500
Portland	4	–	10	.286	11	–	17	.393
Loyola Marymount	4	–	10	.286	11	–	20	.355
Santa Clara	4	–	10	.286	13	–	15	.464
† 2003 WCC tournament winner Rankings from AP Poll

The 2002–03 Gonzaga Bulldogs men's basketball team represented Gonzaga University in the NCAA men's Division I competition.

== Preseason ==
=== Departures ===
Name	Number	Pos.	Height	Weight	Year	Hometown	Reason for departure
Dan Dickau	21	G	6'0"	189	Senior (Redshirt)	Vancouver, WA	Graduated; Entered 2002 NBA draft
Anthony Reason	25	F	6'7"	184	Senior	Ocala, FL	Graduated
Alex Hernandez	15	G	6'4"	224	Senior	Las Vegas, NV	Graduated
Germayne Forbes	11	G	6'2"	191	Sophomore (Redshirt)	London, England	Transferred to West Georgia
Jay Sherrell	34	F	6'8"	230	Sophomore (Redshirt)	Spanaway, WA	Transferred to West Georgia

=== Incoming transfers ===
Name	Pos.	Height	Weight	Year	Hometown	Previous School	Years Remaining	Date Eligible
Tony Skinner	G	6'5"	198	Junior	Albuquerque, NM	Northeastern JC	2	Oct. 1, 2002
Erroll Knight	G	6'7"	205	Sophomore	Seattle, WA	Washington	3	Oct. 1, 2003

=== 2002 Recruiting Class ===
College recruiting information
Name	Hometown	School	Height	Weight	Commit date
Sean Mallon; F	Spokane, WA	Ferris	6 ft 8 in (2.03 m)	218 lb (99 kg)	Jun 25, 2001
Sean Mallon; F	Recruit ratings: Scout: Rivals:				
Overall recruit ranking: Scout: NR Rivals: NR ESPN: NR
Note: In many cases, Scout, Rivals, 247Sports, On3, and ESPN may conflict in their listings of height and weight.; In these cases, the average was taken. ESPN grades are on a 100-point scale.; Sources: "2002 Gonzaga Rivals Commits". Rivals.; "2002 Gonzaga Scout Commits". Scout.; "2002 Gonzaga ESPN Commits". ESPN.; "Scout.com Team Recruiting Rankings". Scout.; "2002 Team Ranking". Rivals.; "2002–03 Gonzaga Bulldogs men's basketball team". 247Sports.

== Roster ==
2002–03 Gonzaga Bulldogs men's basketball team
Players
Coaches

Pos.	#	Name	Height	Weight	Year	Previous school	Hometown
F	32	Zach Gourde	6 ft 8 in (2.03 m)	245 lb (111 kg)	RS Sr	Prairie	Vancouver, WA
G	1	Winston Brooks	6 ft 0 in (1.83 m)	198 lb (90 kg)	Sr	Huguenot; Howard College; North Idaho College	Richmond, VA
C	34	Richard Fox	6 ft 11 in (2.11 m)	265 lb (120 kg)	RS Jr	Regis Jesuit; Colorado	Denver, CO
G	20	Kyle Bankhead	6 ft 0 in (1.83 m)	195 lb (88 kg)	RS Jr	Walla Walla	Walla Walla, WA
G	4	Tony Skinner	6 ft 5 in (1.96 m)	198 lb (90 kg)	Jr	Cibola; Northeastern JC	Albuquerque, NM
G	10	Blake Stepp	6 ft 4 in (1.93 m)	194 lb (88 kg)	Jr	South Eugene	Eugene, OR
F	33	Cory Violette	6 ft 8 in (2.03 m)	265 lb (120 kg)	Jr	Bishop Kelly	Boise, ID
G	14	Brian Michaelson (W)	6 ft 3 in (1.91 m)	203 lb (92 kg)	RS So	Jesuit	Portland, OR
F	1	Ronny Turiaf	6 ft 10 in (2.08 m)	243 lb (110 kg)	So	INSEP	Le Robert, Martinique
G	22	Erroll Knight (I) (redshirt)	6 ft 7 in (2.01 m)	205 lb (93 kg)	So	Chief Sealth; Washington	Seattle, WA
F	30	Dustin Villepique	6 ft 9 in (2.06 m)	235 lb (107 kg)	RS Fr	Simi Valley	Simi Valley, CA
G	13	Josh Reisman	6 ft 1 in (1.85 m)	165 lb (75 kg)	RS Fr	Mount Vernon	Mount Vernon, WA
F	23	Tyler Amaya	6 ft 7 in (2.01 m)	200 lb (91 kg)	RS Fr	Mount Vernon	Mount Vernon, WA
G	15	Colin Floyd (W)	6 ft 2 in (1.88 m)	187 lb (85 kg)	RS Fr	Sprague-Harrington	Harrington, WA
G	34	A.C James (W)	6 ft 3 in (1.91 m)	186 lb (84 kg)	RS Fr	Arizona	London Kingdom, UK
F	32	Sean Mallon (redshirt)	6 ft 8 in (2.03 m)	218 lb (99 kg)	Fr	Ferris	Spokane, WA

Head coach

- Mark Few

Assistant coach(es)

- Bill Grier
- Leon Rice
- Tommy Lloyd

Legend

- (C) Team captain
- (S) Suspended
- (I) Ineligible
- (W) Walk-on
- Injured
- Current redshirt

Roster
Last update: 2010-3-14

== Schedule ==
Date time, TV	Rank^{#}	Opponent^{#}	Result	Record	Site (attendance) city, state
Exhibition
November 8, 2002*; 7:00 pm		Seattle Stars	W 108–80		Charlotte Y. Martin Centre (3,783); Spokane, WA
November 15, 2002*; 8:00 pm		Australian All-Stars	W 104–64		Charlotte Y. Martin Centre (3,733); Spokane, WA
Regular season
November 22, 2002*; 7:00 pm, PAX	No. 21	Hofstra	W 69–61	1–0	Charlotte Y. Martin Centre (4,000); Spokane, WA
November 25, 2002*; 8:00 pm, ESPN2	No. 20	vs. Utah; Maui Invitational – Quarterfinals	W 71–52	2–0	Lahaina Civic Center (2,500); Maui, HI
November 26, 2002*; 6:00 pm, ESPN	No. 20	vs. No. 19 Indiana; Maui Invitational – Semifinals	L 76–75	2–1	Lahaina Civic Center (2,500); Maui, HI
November 27, 2002*; 1:00 pm, ESPN2	No. 20	vs. No. 15 Kentucky; Maui Invitational – 3rd Place Game	L 80–72	2–2	Lahaina Civic Center (2,500); Maui, HI
December 2, 2002*; 7:00 pm, KHQ-TV		Washington	W 95–89 ^{OT}	3–2	Charlotte Y. Martin Centre (4,000); Spokane, WA
December 5, 2002*; 6:00 pm, PAX		at Montana	W 75–67	4–2	Dahlberg Arena (5,254); Missoula, MT
December 7, 2002*; 7:00 pm		at Washington State	W 110–104	5–2	Beasley Coliseum (5,746); Pullman, WA
December 15, 2002*; 10:00 am, FOX Sports		vs. Georgia; Peach Bowl Classic	L 95–83	5–3	Philips Arena (10,919); Atlanta, GA
December 17, 2002*; 4:00 pm, ESPN		vs. NC State; Jimmy V Classic	W 69–60	6–3	Meadowlands Arena (8,867); East Rutherford, NJ
December 20, 2002*; 7:00 pm, PAX		Long Beach State	W 90–55	7–3	Charlotte Y. Martin Centre (4,000); Spokane, WA
December 22, 2002*; 4:30 pm, KSKN		Eastern Washington	W 67–64	8–3	Spokane Arena (11,000); Spokane, WA
December 28, 2002*; 2:30 pm, KHQ-TV		vs. Stanford; Pete Newell Challenge	L 81–71	8–4	Oakland Arena (15,734); Oakland, CA
December 31, 2002*; 5:00 pm, KHQ-TV		Saint Joseph's	L 79–78 ^{OT}	8–5	Charlotte Y. Martin Centre (4,000); Spokane, WA
January 2, 2003*; 7:00 pm		at Portland State	W 87–49	9–5	Stott Center (3,235); Portland, OR
January 9, 2003; 7:00 pm, PAX		Loyola Marymount	W 85–73	10––5 (1–0)	Charlotte Y. Martin Centre (4,000); Spokane, WA
January 12, 2003; 1:00 pm, FOX Sports Northwest		Pepperdine	W 92–72	11–5 (2–0)	Charlotte Y. Martin Centre (4,000); Spokane, WA
January 17, 2003; 7:00 pm		at St. Mary's	W 56–53	12–5 (3–0)	McKeon Pavilion (3,118); Moraga, CA
January 19, 2003; 1:00 pm, FOX Sports Northwest		at San Francisco	W 66–56	13–5 (4–0)	War Memorial Gymnasium (4,177); San Francisco, CA
January 24, 2003; 7:30 pm, FOX Sports Northwest		at Portland	W 70–67	14–5 (5–0)	Chiles Center (4,902); Portland, OR
January 30, 2003; 7:00 pm, PAX		San Diego	W 89–65	15–5 (6–0)	Charlotte Y. Martin Centre (4,000); Spokane, WA
February 1, 2003; 5:00 pm, KHQ-TV		Santa Clara	W 96–62	16–5 (7–0)	Charlotte Y. Martin Centre (4,000); Spokane, WA
February 5, 2003; 9:00 pm, ESPN		at Pepperdine	W 78–63	17–5 (8–0)	Firestone Fieldhouse (3,297); Malibu, CA
February 8, 2003; 7:00 pm		at Loyola Marymount	L 80–74	17–6 (8–1)	Gersten Pavilion (2,501); Los Angeles, CA
February 13, 2003; 7:00 pm, PAX		St. Mary's	W 73–49	18–6 (9–1)	Charlotte Y. Martin Centre (4,000); Spokane, WA
February 15, 2003; 6:00 pm, KHQ-TV		San Francisco	W 82–71	19–6 (10–1)	Charlotte Y. Martin Centre (4,000); Spokane, WA
February 19, 2003; 7:00 pm, PAX		Portland	L 72–68	19–7 (10–2)	Charlotte Y. Martin Centre (4,000); Spokane, WA
February 22, 2003*; 9:00 pm, ESPN		Tulsa	W 69–60	20–7	Charlotte Y. Martin Centre (4,000); Spokane, WA
February 27, 2003; 7:00 pm		at Santa Clara	W 71–66	21–7 (11–2)	Leavey Center (3,027); Santa Clara, CA
March 1, 2003; 6:00 pm, FOX Sports Northwest		at San Diego	W 72–69	22–7 (12–2)	Jenny Craig Pavilion (5,178); San Diego, CA
2003 West Coast Conference tournament
March 9, 2003; 9:00 pm, ESPN	(1)	vs. (5) St. Mary's; Semifinals	W 73–52	23–7	Jenny Craig Pavilion (5,382); San Diego, CA
March 10, 2003; 9:00 pm, ESPN	(1)	(2) San Diego; Championship	L 72–63	23–8	Jenny Craig Pavilion (5,391); San Diego, CA
NCAA Division I men's basketball tournament
March 20, 2003*; 9:40 am, CBS	(9 W)	vs. (8 W) Cincinnati; NCAA Tournament Round of 64	W 74–69	24–8	Jon M. Huntsman Center (14,378); Salt Lake City, UT
March 22, 2003*; 2:40 pm, CBS	(9 W)	vs. (1 W) No. 2 Arizona; NCAA Tournament Round of 32	L 96–95 ^{2OT}	24–9	Jon M. Huntsman Center (14,627); Salt Lake City, UT
*Non-conference game. ^{#}Rankings from AP Poll. (#) Tournament seedings in parentheses. W=West. All times are in Pacific Time.
