= 2003 Mountain West Conference men's basketball tournament =

- Classification: Division I
- Season: 2002–03
- Teams: 8
- Site: Thomas & Mack Center; Paradise, NV
- Champions: Colorado State (1st title)
- MVP: Matt Nelson (Colorado State)

2002–03 Mountain West Conference men's basketball standings
	Conf.				Overall
Team	W		L	PCT	W		L	PCT
Utah	11	–	3	.786	25	–	8	.758
BYU	11	–	3	.786	23	–	9	.719
Wyoming	8	–	6	.571	21	–	11	.656
UNLV	8	–	6	.571	21	–	11	.656
San Diego State	6	–	8	.429	16	–	14	.533
Colorado State †	5	–	9	.357	19	–	14	.576
New Mexico	4	–	10	.286	10	–	18	.357
Air Force	3	–	11	.214	12	–	16	.429
† 2003 Mountain West tournament winner Rankings from AP Poll

The 2003 Mountain West Conference men's basketball tournament was played at the Thomas & Mack Center in Las Vegas, Nevada, from March 13–15, 2003. Colorado State upset host school University of Nevada at Las Vegas, 62–61, in the championship game to win the Mountain West Conference tournament and the league's automatic NCAA Tournament bid.

Colorado State became, and as of 2011, remains the lowest seed (6) to ever win the MWC Tournament. They supplanted San Diego State who, just one year earlier, had won the tournament as a number 5 seed. They also had upset UNLV in the tournament championship game.

In 2004 the tournament would move to the Pepsi Center in Denver where it would stay for the next three years. It would return in 2007, where it has remained since.

== Bracket ==
Quarterfinals; March 13
2	BYU	71
7	New Mexico	56
3	Wyoming	71
6	Colorado State	74
1	Utah	42
8	Air Force	38
4	UNLV	83
5	San Diego State	67

Semifinals; March 14
2	BYU	80
6	Colorado State	86*
1	Utah	41
4	UNLV	64

Finals; March 15
6	Colorado State	62
4	UNLV	61

* Overtime
