= Jason Keep =

American basketball player (born 1978)

Personal information
- Born: May 9, 1978 (age 48) Bend, Oregon, U.S.
- Listed height: 6 ft 11 in (2.11 m)
- Listed weight: 280 lb (127 kg)

Career information
- High school: Pullman (Pullman, Washington); Moscow (Moscow, Idaho)
- College: North Idaho College (1998–1999); Oklahoma State (1999–2001); San Diego (2002–2003)
- NBA draft: 2003: undrafted
- Position: Center

Career highlights
- First-team All-WCC (2003); WCC tournament MVP (2003)

Jason Beau Keep (born May 9, 1978) is an American former professional basketball player who began his collegiate career with the Oklahoma State Cowboys before transferring to the San Diego Toreros. He was undrafted in the 2003 NBA draft but tried out for multiple NBA teams, including the Indiana Pacers, San Antonio Spurs, Houston Rockets, and Sacramento Kings. Keep played professionally overseas in the Philippines, Spain, Italy, Cyprus, Egypt, Chile, Poland, Argentina, Mexico, France, and Germany. He holds the NBA Draft Combine bench press record with 27 repetitions. Keep also played for C.D. Universidad de Concepción Básquetbol in the División Mayor del Básquetbol de Chile and was awarded MVP of the West Coast Conference tournament. He currently owns and operates a mobile tattoo business, Keep N' Ink Tattoo Business, and has achieved a Bachelor of Arts degree from the University of San Diego.

== Player profile ==
Born in Bend, Oregon, Keep played his final college season for San Diego after starting his career at North Idaho College in Coeur d'Alene, Idaho and later Oklahoma State. He sat out 2001–02 season at San Diego under NCAA transfer rules.
