= 2000 Mountain West Conference men's basketball tournament =

- Classification: Division I
- Season: 1999–00
- Site: Thomas & Mack Center; Paradise, NV
- Champions: UNLV (1st title)
- Winning coach: Bill Bayno
- MVP: Mark Dickel (UNLV)

1999–2000 Mountain West Conference men's basketball standings
	Conf.				Overall
Team	W		L	PCT	W		L	PCT
UNLV †	10	–	4	.714	23	–	8	.742
Utah	10	–	4	.714	23	–	9	.719
New Mexico	9	–	5	.643	18	–	14	.563
Colorado State	8	–	6	.571	18	–	12	.600
Wyoming	8	–	6	.571	19	–	12	.613
BYU	7	–	7	.500	22	–	11	.667
Air Force	4	–	10	.286	8	–	20	.286
San Diego State	0	–	14	.000	5	–	23	.179
† 2000 Mountain West tournament winner Rankings from AP Poll

The inaugural Mountain West Conference men's basketball tournament was played at the Thomas & Mack Center in Las Vegas, Nevada from March 9–11, 2000. All eight member schools entered the three round tournament seeded according to their regular season league finish.

Host school and top seed UNLV won the tournament by beating 6th seed BYU 79–56. They were not awarded an automatic bid to the NCAA Tournament as the MWC did not have one this year. UNLV did receive an at-large invitation.

== Bracket ==
Quarterfinals; March 9
3	New Mexico	43
6	BYU	55
2	Utah	74
7	Air Force	65
1	UNLV	42
8	San Diego State	38
4	Colorado State	68
5	Wyoming	74

Semifinals; March 10
6	BYU	58
2	Utah	54
1	UNLV	97
5	Wyoming	92

Finals; March 11
6	BYU	56
1	UNLV	79
