= List of LSU Tigers men's basketball head coaches =

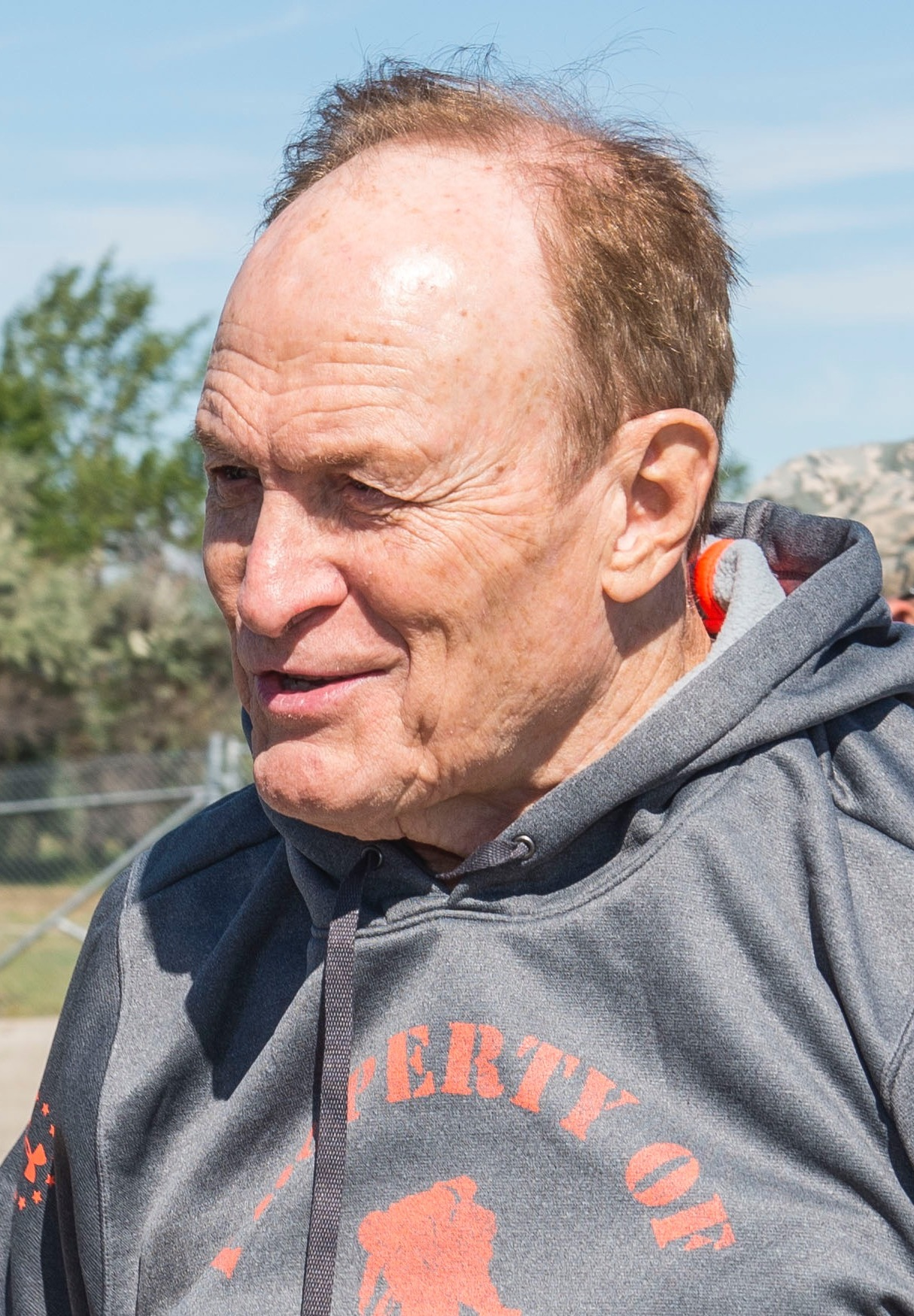
Dale Brown, the winningest head coach in Tigers men's basketball history.

The following is a list of LSU Tigers men's basketball head coaches. There have been 23 head coaches of the Tigers in their 115-season history.

LSU's current head coach is Will Wade. He was hired as the Tigers' head coach in March 2026, replacing Matt McMahon (basketball), who was fired before the 2025 NCAA tournament.

No.	Tenure	Coach	Years	Record	Pct.
1	1908–1909	Edgar Wingard	1	5–2	.714
2	1909–1911	John W. Mayhew	2	11–4	.733
3	1911–1913	F. M. Long	2	6–9	.400
4	1913–1918; 1919–1920	Charles C. Stroud	6	82–21	.796
5	1918–1919	R. E. Edmonds	1	1–0	1.000
6	1920–1921	Branch Bocock	1	19–4	.826
7	1921–1923	Tad Gormley	2	25–11	.694
8	1923–1924	Moon Ducote	1	8–12	.400
9	1924–1925	Hugh E. Wilson	1	10–7	.588
10	1925–1942; 1945–1957	Harry Rabenhorst	29	340–264	.563
11	1942–1944	Dale Morey	2	28–19	.596
12	1944–1945 (Note: Fatherree left to join the U.S. Army in February 1945. A. L. Swanson served as head coach for the remainder of the 1944–45 season.)	Jesse Fatherree	1	11–7	.611
13	1945	A. L. Swanson	1	4–2	.667
14	1957–1965	Jay McCreary	8	82–115	.416
15	1965–1966	Frank Truitt	1	6–20	.231
16	1966–1972	Press Maravich	6	76–86	.469
17	1972–1997 (Note: LSU vacated five wins from the 1996–97 season. Brown's on-court record is 448–301 (.598).)	Dale Brown	25	443–301	.595
18	1997–2008 (Note: Brady was fired on February 8, 2008. Butch Pierre served as interim head coach for the remainder of the 2007–08 season.)	John Brady	11	192–139	.580
19	2008	Butch Pierre	1	5–5	.500
20	2008–2012	Trent Johnson	4	67–64	.511
21	2012–2017	Johnny Jones	5	90–72	.556
22	2017–2022 (Note: Wade was indefinitely suspended on March 8, 2019. Tony Benford served as interim head coach for the remainder of the 2018–19 season. Wade was reinstated as head coach on April 14, 2019.) (Note: Wade was fired on March 12, 2022. Kevin Nickelberry served as interim head coach for the remainder of the 2021–22 season.)	Will Wade	5	105–51	.673
–	2019*	Tony Benford	1	3–2	.600
–	2022*	Kevin Nickelberry	1	0–1	.000
23	2022–2026	Matt McMahon	4	60–70	.462
Totals		23 coaches	115 seasons	1,638–1,237	.570
Records updated through end of 2022–23 season * - Denotes interim head coach. Source
