= List of LSU Tigers men's basketball seasons =

This is a list of LSU Tigers men's basketball team seasons and history from their first season in 1908–09 to present. Sources:

== History ==
LSU Tigers basketball
First season	1908–09
SEC History
Conference Regular Season Championships	11 (1935, 1953, 1954, 1979, 1981, 1985, 1991, 2000, 2006, 2009, 2019)
Conference tournament championships	1 (1980)
NCAA Tournament History
NCAA Appearances	24 (1953, 1954, 1979, 1980, 1981, 1984, 1985, 1986, 1987, 1988, 1989, 1990, 1991, 1992, 1993, 2000, 2003, 2005, 2006, 2009, 2015, 2019, 2021, 2022)
Sweet Sixteen	10 (1953, 1954, 1979, 1980, 1981, 1986, 1987, 2000, 2006, 2019)
Elite Eight	6 (1953, 1980, 1981, 1986, 1987, 2006)
Final Four	4 (1953, 1981, 1986, 2006)
National Championships
National Championships	1 (1935); *LSU claims a national championship for the 1934–35 season, however, no major organization has named them national champions for the season
Accurate as of the end of the 2020-21 season

== Season-by-season results ==
The following is a list of LSU Tigers basketball seasons with records and notable accomplishments.

Record table
Season	Team	Overall	Conference	Standing	Postseason
Edgar Wingard (Southern Intercollegiate Athletic Association) (1908–1909)
1908–09	Edgar Wingard	5–2	2–0		
Edgar Wingard:		5–2 (.714)	2–0 (1.000)		
John W. Mayhew (Southern Intercollegiate Athletic Association) (1909–1911)
1909–10	John W. Mayhew	3–1	2–0		
1910–11	John W. Mayhew	8–3	6–1		
John W. Mayhew:		11–4 (.733)	8–1 (.889)		
F. M. Long (Southern Intercollegiate Athletic Association) (1911–1913)
1911–12	F. M. Long	4–6	2–3		
1912–13	F. M. Long	2–3	1–3		
F. M. Long:		6–9 (.400)	3–6 (.333)		
C. C. Stroud (Southern Intercollegiate Athletic Association) (1913–1918)
1913–14	C. C. Stroud	7–5	0–4		
1914–15	C. C. Stroud	10–1	3–1		
1915–16	C. C. Stroud	14–10	6–7		
1916–17	C. C. Stroud	20–2	11–0		
1917–18	C. C. Stroud	12–1	3–0		
R. E. Edmonds (Independent) (1918–1919)
1918–19	R. E. Edmonds	1–0	0–0		
R. E. Edmonds:		1–0 (1.000)	0–0 (–)		
C. C. Stroud (Southern Intercollegiate Athletic Association) (1919–1920)
1919–20	C. C. Stroud	19–2	8–2		
C. C. Stroud:		82–21 (.796)	31–14 (.689)		
Branch Bocock (Southern Conference) (1920–1921)
1920–21	Branch Bocock	19–4	5–2		
Branch Bocock:		19–4 (.826)	5–2 (.714)		
Frank "Tad" Gormley (Southern Conference) (1921–1923)
1921–22	Tad Gormley	15–1	3–1		
1922–23	Tad Gormley	10–10	0–6	19th	
Frank "Tad" Gormley:		25–11 (.694)	3–7 (.333)		
Moon Ducote (Southern Conference) (1923–1924)
1923–24	Moon Ducote	8–12	0–7	21st	
Moon Ducote:		8–12 (.400)	0–7 (.000)		
Hugh E. "Gob" Wilson (Southern Conference) (1924–1925)
1924–25	Gob Wilson	10–7	1–4	T–14th	
Hugh E. "Gob" Wilson:		10–7 (.588)	1–4 (.200)		
Harry Rabenhorst (Southern Conference) (1925–1932)
1925–26	Harry Rabenhorst	9–9	4–5	12th	
1926–27	Harry Rabenhorst	7–9	3–5	15th	
1927–28	Harry Rabenhorst	14–4	7–3	6th	
1928–29	Harry Rabenhorst	8–13	5–9	16th	
1929–30	Harry Rabenhorst	10–11	6–7	13th	
1930–31	Harry Rabenhorst	7–8	4–4	12th	
1931–32	Harry Rabenhorst	11–9	8–8	12th	
Harry Rabenhorst (Southeastern Conference) (1932–1942)
1932–33	Harry Rabenhorst	15–8	13–7	4th	
1933–34	Harry Rabenhorst	13–4	13–3	3rd	
1934–35	Harry Rabenhorst	14–1	12–0	1st	
1935–36	Harry Rabenhorst	10–10	9–6	T–6th	
1936–37	Harry Rabenhorst	13–7	7–6	7th	
1937–38	Harry Rabenhorst	10–10	7–6	6th	
1938–39	Harry Rabenhorst	13–7	10–5	4th	
1939–40	Harry Rabenhorst	10–8	8–4	4th	
1940–41	Harry Rabenhorst	9–9	7–5	5th	
1941–42	Harry Rabenhorst	8–7	8–3	4th	
Dale Morey (Southeastern Conference) (1942–1944)
1942–43	Dale Morey	18–4	11–2	2nd	
1943–44	Dale Morey	10–15	0–4	4th	
Dale Morey:		28–19 (.596)	11–6 (.647)		
Jesse Fatheree (Southeastern Conference) (1944–1945)
1944–45	Jesse Fatheree; A. L. Swanson	15–9^{[Note A]}	3–3		
Jesse Fatheree:		15–9 (.625)^{[Note B]}	3–3 (.500)		
Harry Rabenhorst (Southeastern Conference) (1945–1957)
1945–46	Harry Rabenhorst	18–3	8–0	T–1st	
1946–47	Harry Rabenhorst	17–4	9–2	2nd	
1947–48	Harry Rabenhorst	8–18	4–10	11th	
1948–49	Harry Rabenhorst	15–10	7–6	5th	
1949–50	Harry Rabenhorst	13–12	5–8	9th	
1950–51	Harry Rabenhorst	10–14	6–8	T–5th	
1951–52	Harry Rabenhorst	17–7	9–5	T–2nd	
1952–53	Harry Rabenhorst	22–3	13–0	1st	NCAA Final Four
1953–54	Harry Rabenhorst	20–5	14–0	T–1st	NCAA Sweet Sixteen
1954–55	Harry Rabenhorst	6–18	3–11	11th	
1955–56	Harry Rabenhorst	7–17	5–9	9th	
1956–57	Harry Rabenhorst	6–19	1–13	12th	
Harry Rabenhorst:		340–264 (.563)	215–158 (.576)		
Jay McCreary (Southeastern Conference) (1957–1965)
1957–58	Jay McCreary	7–18	3–11	T–10th	
1958–59	Jay McCreary	10–15	2–12	T–10th	
1959–60	Jay McCreary	5–18	3–11	T–11th	
1960–61	Jay McCreary	11–14	6–8	T–6th	
1961–62	Jay McCreary	13–11	7–7	5th	
1962–63	Jay McCreary	12–12	5–9	T–8th	
1963–64	Jay McCreary	12–13	8–6	T–4th	
1964–65	Jay McCreary	12–14	7–9	7th	
Jay McCreary:		82–115 (.416)	41–73 (.360)		
Frank Truitt (Southeastern Conference) (1965–1966)
1965–66	Frank Truitt	6–20	2–14	T–10th	
Frank Truitt:		6–20 (.231)	2–14 (.125)		
Press Maravich (Southeastern Conference) (1966–1972)
1966–67	Press Maravich	3–23	1–17	10th	
1967–68	Press Maravich	14–12	8–10	T–6th	
1968–69	Press Maravich	13–13	7–11	T–7th	
1969–70	Press Maravich	22–10	13–5	2nd	NIT Fourth Place
1970–71	Press Maravich	14–12	10–8	3rd	
1971–72	Press Maravich	10–16	6–12	T–7th	
Press Maravich:		76–86 (.469)	45–63 (.417)		
Dale Brown (Southeastern Conference) (1972–1997)
1972–73	Dale Brown	14–10	9–9	5th	
1973–74	Dale Brown	12–14	6–12	8th	
1974–75	Dale Brown	10–16	6–12	7th	
1975–76	Dale Brown	12–14	5–13	9th	
1976–77	Dale Brown	15–12	8–10	5th	
1977–78	Dale Brown	18–9	12–6	3rd	
1978–79	Dale Brown	23–6	14–4	1st	NCAA Division I Sweet Sixteen
1979–80	Dale Brown	26–6	14–4	2nd	NCAA Division I Elite Eight
1980–81	Dale Brown	31–5	17–1	1st	NCAA Division I Final Four
1981–82	Dale Brown	14–14	11–7	5th	NIT first round
1982–83	Dale Brown	19–13	10–8	2nd	NIT first round
1983–84	Dale Brown	18–11	11–7	3rd	NCAA Division I first round
1984–85	Dale Brown	19–10	13–5	1st	NCAA Division I first round
1985–86	Dale Brown	26–12	9–9	5th	NCAA Division I Final Four
1986–87	Dale Brown	24–15	8–10	6th	NCAA Division I Elite Eight
1987–88	Dale Brown	16–14	10–8	4th	NCAA Division I first round
1988–89	Dale Brown	20–12	11–7	4th	NCAA Division I first round
1989–90	Dale Brown	23–9	12–6	2nd	NCAA Division I second round
1990–91	Dale Brown	20–10	13–5	T–2nd^{[Note C]}	NCAA Division I first round
1991–92	Dale Brown	21–10	12–4	2nd (West)	NCAA Division I second round
1992–93	Dale Brown	22–11	9–7	2nd (West)	NCAA Division I first round
1993–94	Dale Brown	11–16	5–11	5th (West)	
1994–95	Dale Brown	12–15	6–10	5th (West)	
1995–96	Dale Brown	12–17	4–12	6th (West)	
1996–97	Dale Brown	10–20	3–13	6th (West)	
Dale Brown:		448–301 (.598)	238–200 (.543)		
John Brady (Southeastern Conference) (1997–2008)
1997–98	John Brady	9–18	2–14	6th (West)	
1998–99	John Brady	12–15	4–12	6th (West)	
1999–00	John Brady	28–6	12–4	1st (West)	NCAA Division I Sweet Sixteen
2000–01	John Brady	13–16	2–14	6th (West)	
2001–02	John Brady	19–15	6–10	T–4th (West)	NIT second round
2002–03	John Brady	21–11	8–8	T–2nd (West)	NCAA Division I first round
2003–04	John Brady	18–11	8–8	T–2nd (West)	NIT first round
2004–05	John Brady	20–10	12–4	T–1st (West)	NCAA Division I first round
2005–06	John Brady	27–9	14–2	1st (West)	NCAA Division I Final Four
2006–07	John Brady	17–15	5–11	6th (West)	
2007–08	John Brady; Butch Pierre	13–18^{[Note D]}	6–10	4th (West)	
John Brady:		197–144 (.578)^{[Note E]}	79–97 (.449)^{[Note F]}		
Trent Johnson (Southeastern Conference) (2008–2012)
2008–09	Trent Johnson	27–8	13–3	1st (West)	NCAA Division I second round
2009–10	Trent Johnson	11–20	2–14	6th (West)	
2010–11	Trent Johnson	11–20	3–13	6th (West)	
2011–12	Trent Johnson	18–15	7–9	8th	NIT first round
Trent Johnson:		67–63 (.515)	25–39 (.391)		
Johnny Jones (Southeastern Conference) (2012–2017)
2012–13	Johnny Jones	19–12	9–9	T–8th	
2013–14	Johnny Jones	20–14	9–9	T–6th	NIT second round
2014–15	Johnny Jones	22–11	11–7	T–3rd	NCAA Division I second round
2015–16	Johnny Jones	19–14	11–7	T–3rd	
2016–17	Johnny Jones	10–21	2–16	T–13th	
Johnny Jones:		90–72 (.556)	42–48 (.467)		
Will Wade (Southeastern Conference) (2017–2022)
2017–18	Will Wade	18–15	8–10	T–9th	NIT second round
2018–19	Will Wade; Tony Benford	28–7^{[Note G]}	16–2	1st	NCAA Division I Sweet Sixteen
2019–20	Will Wade	21–10	12–6	T–2nd	No postseason held
2020–21	Will Wade	19–10	11–6	3rd	NCAA Division I second round
2021–22	Will Wade	22–12	9–9	T–5th	NCAA Division I first round
Will Wade:		108–54 (.667)^{[Note H]}	56–33 (.629)^{[Note I]}		
Matt McMahon (Southeastern Conference) (2022–present)
2022–23	Matt McMahon	14–19	2–16	14th	
2023–24	Matt McMahon	17–16	9–9	T–7th	NIT First Round
2024–25	Matt McMahon	14–18	3–15	15th	
2025–26	Matt McMahon	15-17	3–15	15th	
Matt McMahon:		60–70 (.484)	17–55 (.286)		
Total:		1684–1288 (.568)			
National champion Postseason invitational champion Conference regular season champion Conference regular season and conference tournament champion Division regular season champion Division regular season and conference tournament champion Conference tournament champion

^A. Fatheree left LSU mid-season to join the U.S. Army. A. L. Swanson coached LSU for the remainder of the season.
^B. LSU's record under Fatheree is 11–7, 4–2 under Swanson.
^C. Kentucky, which finished first, was ineligible for the conference title. LSU shared the championship with Mississippi State.
^C. Brady was fired from LSU on February 8, 2008. Butch Pierre was named interim coach for the final 10 games.
^D. LSU's record under Brady is 192–139, 5–5 under Pierre.
^E.LSU's conference record under Brady is 74–93, 5–4 under Pierre.
^F. Tony Benford was interim coach during Will Wade's indefinite suspension.
^G. LSU's record under Wade is 83–40, 3–2 under Benford.
^H. LSU's conference record under Wade is 46–24, 1–0 under Benford.
