= 2002–03 LSU Tigers basketball team =

American college basketball season

2002–03 LSU Tigers basketball

NCAA tournament, First Round
- Conference: Southeastern Conference
- West
- Record: 21–11 (8–8 SEC)
- Head coach: John Brady (6th season)
- Assistant coaches: Nikita Johnson; Butch Pierre; John Treloar
- Home arena: Pete Maravich Assembly Center

2002–03 Southeastern Conference men's basketball standings
	Conf.				Overall
Team	W		L	PCT	W		L	PCT
East
No. 1 Kentucky †	16	–	0	1.000	32	–	4	.889
No. 10 Florida	12	–	4	.750	25	–	8	.758
No. 25 Georgia	11	–	5	.688	19	–	8	.704
Tennessee	9	–	7	.563	17	–	12	.586
South Carolina	5	–	11	.313	12	–	16	.429
Vanderbilt	3	–	13	.188	11	–	18	.379
West
No. 20 Mississippi State	9	–	7	.563	21	–	10	.677
Auburn	8	–	8	.500	22	–	12	.647
LSU	8	–	8	.500	21	–	11	.656
Alabama	7	–	9	.438	17	–	12	.586
Ole Miss	4	–	12	.250	14	–	15	.483
Arkansas	4	–	12	.250	9	–	19	.321
† 2003 SEC tournament winner Rankings from AP Poll

The 2002–03 LSU Tigers basketball team represented Louisiana State University in the Southeastern Conference (SEC) during the 2002–03 NCAA Division I men's basketball season. The team was coached by John Brady and played their home games at Pete Maravich Assembly Center in Baton Rouge, Louisiana.

== Roster ==
2002–03 LSU Tigers men's basketball team
Players
Coaches

Pos.	#	Name	Height	Weight	Year	Hometown
G	0	Brian Green	6 ft 4 in (1.93 m)	188 lb (85 kg)	Sr	Baton Rouge, Louisiana
G	1	Tony Gipson	6 ft 1 in (1.85 m)	162 lb (73 kg)	So	Farmerville, Louisiana
G	2	Darrel Mitchell	5 ft 11 in (1.8 m)	174 lb (79 kg)	Fr	Saint Martinville, Louisiana
G	3	Torris Bright	6 ft 4 in (1.93 m)	204 lb (93 kg)	Sr	Slidell, Louisiana
G	10	Charlie Thompson	6 ft 1 in (1.85 m)	190 lb (86 kg)	Jr	Lake Charles, Louisiana
G	11	Josh Maravich	6 ft 3 in (1.91 m)	185 lb (84 kg)	Fr	Covington, Louisiana
F	12	Ronald Dupree	6 ft 7 in (2.01 m)	209 lb (95 kg)	Sr	Biloxi, Mississippi
F	14	Jaime Lloreda	6 ft 9 in (2.06 m)	246 lb (112 kg)	Jr	Colón, Panama
F	20	Tim Bush	6 ft 6 in (1.98 m)	258 lb (117 kg)	Fr	New Orleans, Louisiana
G	21	Courtney Trask	6 ft 3 in (1.91 m)	185 lb (84 kg)	Jr	Baton Rouge, Louisiana
G	22	Xavier Whipple	6 ft 2 in (1.88 m)	170 lb (77 kg)	So	McIntyre, Georgia
F	32	Paul Wolfert	6 ft 9 in (2.06 m)	190 lb (86 kg)	Fr	Burr Ridge, Illinois
G/F	34	Mildon Ambres	6 ft 5 in (1.96 m)	217 lb (98 kg)	Fr	Opelousas, Louisiana
G	41	Collis Temple	6 ft 7 in (2.01 m)	218 lb (99 kg)	Sr	Baton Rouge, Louisiana
G	42	Antonio Hudson	6 ft 5 in (1.96 m)	206 lb (93 kg)	So	Grambling, Louisiana
F	44	Thomas Davis	6 ft 8 in (2.03 m)	230 lb (104 kg)	Sr	Alexandria, Louisiana
F	51	Shawnson Johnson	6 ft 9 in (2.06 m)	242 lb (110 kg)	Jr	Shreveport, Louisiana
F	54	Brad Bridgewater	6 ft 8 in (2.03 m)	268 lb (122 kg)	Sr	New Roads, Louisiana

Head coach

- John Brady (Belhaven)

Assistant coach(es)

- Nikita Johnson (West Georgia)
- Butch Pierre (Mississippi State)
- John Treloar (Belhaven)

Legend

- (C) Team captain
- (S) Suspended
- (I) Ineligible
- (W) Walk-on
- Injured
- Current redshirt

Roster

== Schedule and results ==
Date time, TV	Rank^{#}	Opponent^{#}	Result	Record	Site (attendance) city, state
Regular season
Nov 22, 2002*		Nicholls State	W 68–24	1–0	Pete Maravich Assembly Center; Baton Rouge, Louisiana
Mar 8, 2003		Alabama	W 66–62	19–9 (8–8)	Pete Maravich Assembly Center; Baton Rouge, Louisiana
SEC Tournament
Mar 13, 2003*		vs. Arkansas; First Round	W 85–56	20–9	Louisiana Superdome; New Orleans, Louisiana
Mar 14, 2003*		vs. No. 7 Florida; Quarterfinals	W 65–61	21–9	Louisiana Superdome; New Orleans, Louisiana
Mar 15, 2003*		vs. Mississippi State; Semifinals	L 61–76	21–10	Louisiana Superdome; New Orleans, Louisiana
NCAA Tournament
Mar 21, 2003*	(8 S)	vs. (9 S) Purdue; First Round	L 56–80	21–11	Birmingham-Jefferson Civic Center; Birmingham, Alabama
*Non-conference game. ^{#}Rankings from AP Poll, NCAA tournament seeds shown in parentheses. (#) Tournament seedings in parentheses. All times are in Central Standard Time.
