= 2002–03 Kentucky Wildcats men's basketball team =

2002–03 season of University of Kentucky men's basketball team

2002–03 Kentucky Wildcats men's basketball
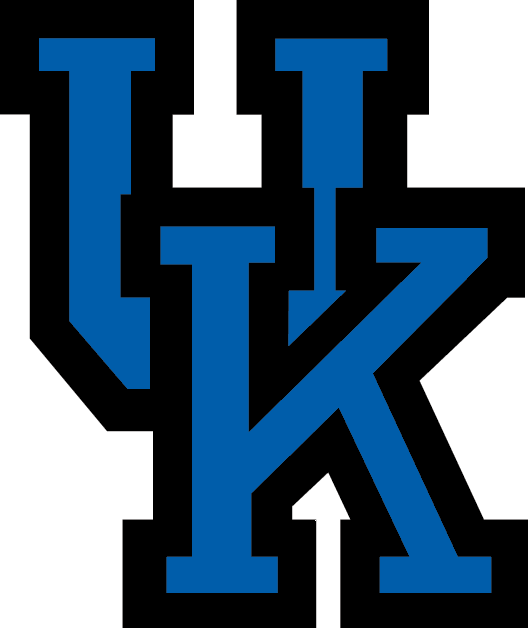

SEC regular season and tournament champions

NCAA tournament, Elite Eight
- Conference: Southeast Conference

Ranking
- Coaches: No. 4
- AP: No. 1
- Record: 32–4 (16–0 SEC)
- Head coach: Tubby Smith (6th season)
- Assistant coaches: David Hobbs; Scott Rigot; Reggie Hanson
- Home arena: Rupp Arena

2002–03 Southeastern Conference men's basketball standings
	Conf.				Overall
Team	W		L	PCT	W		L	PCT
East
No. 1 Kentucky †	16	–	0	1.000	32	–	4	.889
No. 10 Florida	12	–	4	.750	25	–	8	.758
No. 25 Georgia	11	–	5	.688	19	–	8	.704
Tennessee	9	–	7	.563	17	–	12	.586
South Carolina	5	–	11	.313	12	–	16	.429
Vanderbilt	3	–	13	.188	11	–	18	.379
West
No. 20 Mississippi State	9	–	7	.563	21	–	10	.677
Auburn	8	–	8	.500	22	–	12	.647
LSU	8	–	8	.500	21	–	11	.656
Alabama	7	–	9	.438	17	–	12	.586
Ole Miss	4	–	12	.250	14	–	15	.483
Arkansas	4	–	12	.250	9	–	19	.321
† 2003 SEC tournament winner Rankings from AP Poll

The 2002–03 Kentucky Wildcats men's basketball team represented University of Kentucky. The head coach was Tubby Smith, who was in his sixth season as the Wildcats head coach. For the program, it was the 100th season of Kentucky Wildcats basketball. The team was a member of the Southeast Conference and played their home games at Rupp Arena.

The Kentucky Wildcats finished with an overall record of 32–4 and were undefeated in conference play, 16–0. In the 2003 SEC men's basketball tournament the Wildcats beat Vanderbilt, Auburn and Mississippi State. to secure their 24th Tournament Championship. As a #1 seed in the 2003 NCAA Tournament, Kentucky's run continued with wins over IUPUI, Utah and Wisconsin. But in the Elite 8 their season came to an abrupt end with a surprising loss to Marquette 83–69.

== Roster ==
2002–03 Kentucky Wildcats men's basketball team
Players
Coaches

Pos.	#	Name	Height	Weight	Year	Previous school	Hometown
G	1	Cliff Hawkins	6 ft 1 in (1.85 m)	190 lb (86 kg)	Jr	Oak Hill Academy (VA)	Dumfries, Virginia
G	2	Ravi Moss	6 ft 2 in (1.88 m)	190 lb (86 kg)	Fr	University Heights	Hopkinsville, Kentucky
G	3	Brandon Stockton	5 ft 9 in (1.75 m)	170 lb (77 kg)	Fr	Glasgow	Glasgow, Kentucky
G	4	Gerald Fitch	6 ft 3 in (1.91 m)	190 lb (86 kg)	Jr	Westside	Macon, Georgia
G	5	Josh Carrier	6 ft 4 in (1.93 m)	205 lb (93 kg)	So	Bowling Green	Bowling Green, Kentucky
G	10	Keith Bogans	6 ft 5 in (1.96 m)	213 lb (97 kg)	Sr	DeMatha	Washington D.C.
G	11	Preston LeMaster	6 ft 2 in (1.88 m)	190 lb (86 kg)	Fr	Bourbon County	Paris, Kentucky
F	12	Bernard Cote	6 ft 9 in (2.06 m)	215 lb (98 kg)	Fr	Champlain-St. Lambert	St. Lambert, Quebec
F	14	Erik Daniels	6 ft 8 in (2.03 m)	215 lb (98 kg)	Jr	Princeton	Cincinnati, Ohio
G	15	Matt Heissenbuttel	6 ft 4 in (1.93 m)	190 lb (86 kg)	Jr	Lexington Catholic	Lexington, Kentucky
F	24	Kelenna Azubuike	6 ft 5 in (1.96 m)	220 lb (100 kg)	Fr	Victory Christian	Tulsa, Oklahoma
G	33	Antwain Barbour	6 ft 5 in (1.96 m)	195 lb (88 kg)	Jr	Elizabethtown	Elizabethtown, Kentucky
F	40	Jules Camara	6 ft 11 in (2.11 m)	211 lb (96 kg)	Sr	Oak Hill Academy (VA)	Dakar, Senegal
F	44	Chuck Hayes	6 ft 6 in (1.98 m)	240 lb (109 kg)	Jr	Modesto Christian	Modesto, California
F	50	Marquis Estill	6 ft 9 in (2.06 m)	236 lb (107 kg)	Sr	Madison Central	Richmond, Kentucky

Head coach

- Tubby Smith (High Point)

Assistant coach(es)

- David Hobbs (VCU)
- Scott Rigot (Buffalo)
- Reggie Hanson (Kentucky)

Legend

- (C) Team captain
- (S) Suspended
- (I) Ineligible
- (W) Walk-on
- Injured
- Current redshirt

Roster
Last update: April 5, 2013

== Schedule and results ==
Date time, TV	Rank^{#}	Opponent^{#}	Result	Record	Site (attendance) city, state
Non-conference regular season
November 25, 2002*; 9:00 pm, ESPN	No. 17	vs. Arizona State; Maui Invitational	W 82–65	1–0	Lahaina Civic Center (2,500); Maui, HI
November 26, 2002*; 9:00 pm, ESPN	No. 15	vs. Virginia; Maui Invitational	L 61–75	1–1	Lahaina Civic Center (2,500); Maui, HI
November 27, 2002*; 6:30 pm, ESPN	No. 15	vs. No. 20 Gonzaga; Maui Invitational	W 80–72	2–1	Lahaina Civic Center (2,500); Maui, HI
December 3, 2002*; 8:00 pm, UKTV	No. 18	High Point	W 84–64	3–1	Rupp Arena (17,038); Lexington, KY
December 7, 2002*; 2:00 pm, ESPN	No. 18	at No. 12 North Carolina	W 98–81	4–1	Dean Smith Center (21,750); Chapel Hill, NC
December 10, 2002*; 9:00 pm, ESPN	No. 12	at Tulane	W 76–60	5–1	New Orleans Arena (5,216); New Orleans, LA
December 14, 2002*; 4:00 pm, CBS	No. 12	No. 21 Michigan State	L 67–71	5–2	Rupp Arena (23,145); Lexington, KY
December 21, 2002*; 5:00 pm, CBS	No. 16	vs. No. 6 Indiana	W 70–64	6–2	Freedom Hall (20,053); Louisville, KY
December 28, 2002*; 12:00 pm, ESPN	No. 14	at Louisville	L 63–81	6–3	Freedom Hall (20,061); Louisville, KY
December 30, 2002*; 8:00 pm, UKTV	No. 14	Tennessee State	W 115–87	7–3	Rupp Arena (22,052); Lexington, KY
January 2, 2003*; 7:30 pm, UKTV	No. 20	Alcorn State	W 94–63	8–3	Rupp Arena (20,000); Lexington, KY
January 4, 2003*; 4:00 pm, UKTV	No. 20	vs. Ohio	W 83–75	9–3	US Bank Arena (14,506); Cincinnati, OH
Conference regular season
January 8, 2003; 8:00 pm, JP Sports	No. 18	at Tennessee	W 74–71	10–3 (1–0)	Thompson-Boling Arena (17,273); Knoxville, TN
January 11, 2003; 7:00 pm, FSS	No. 18	South Carolina	W 62–55	11–3 (2–0)	Rupp Arena (23,510); Lexington, KY
January 14, 2003; 9:00 pm, ESPN	No. 16	at Vanderbilt	W 74–52	12–3 (3–0)	Memorial Gymnasium (14,168); Nashville, TN
January 18, 2003*; 2:00 pm, CBS	No. 16	No. 10 Notre Dame	W 88–73	13–3	Rupp Arena (22,778); Lexington, KY
January 22, 2003; 7:00 pm, FSS	No. 8	No. 24 Auburn	W 67–51	14–3 (4–0)	Rupp Arena (21,554); Lexington, KY
January 25, 2003; 8:00 pm, ESPN	No. 8	at No. 15 Alabama	W 63–46	15–3 (5–0)	Coleman Coliseum (15,316); Tuscaloosa, AL
February 1, 2003; 1:00 pm, JP Sports	No. 7	at South Carolina	W 87–69	16–3 (6–0)	Carolina Center (14,922); Columbia, SC
February 4, 2003; 9:00 pm, ESPN	No. 6	No. 1 Florida	W 70–55	17–3 (7–0)	Rupp Arena (24,459); Lexington, KY
February 8, 2003; 3:00 pm, JP Sports	No. 6	at Ole Miss	W 80–62	18–3 (8–0)	Tad Smith Coliseum (8,878); Oxford, MS
February 11, 2003; 9:00 pm, ESPN	No. 3	No. 20 Georgia	W 87–67	19–3 (9–0)	Rupp Arena (23,165); Lexington, KY
February 15, 2003; 1:00 pm, JP Sports	No. 3	LSU	W 68–57	20–3 (10–0)	Rupp Arena (22,483); Lexington, KY
February 23, 2003; 2:00 pm, JP Sports	No. 3	at Arkansas	W 66–50	21–3 (11–0)	Bud Walton Arena (18,813); Fayetteville, AR
February 23, 2003; 2:00 pm, CBS	No. 2	No. 19 Mississippi State	W 70–62	22–3 (12–0)	Rupp Arena (23,203); Lexington, KY
February 26, 2003; 8:00 pm, JP Sports	No. 2	Tennessee	W 80–68	23–3 (13–0)	Rupp Arena (23,078); Lexington, KY
March 2, 2003; 4:00 pm, CBS	No. 2	at No. 21 Georgia	W 74–66	24–3 (14–0)	Stegeman Coliseum (10,523); Athens, GA
March 5, 2003; 8:00 pm, JP Sports	No. 2	Vanderbilt; Senior Night	W 106–44	25–3 (15–0)	Rupp Arena (23,061); Lexington, KY
March 8, 2003; 2:00 pm, CBS	No. 2	at No. 3 Florida	W 69–67	26–3 (16–0)	O'Connell Center (12,581); Gainesville, FL
2003 SEC Tournament
March 14, 2003; 3:15 pm, JP Sports	(E1) No. 2	vs. (E5) Vanderbilt; Quarterfinals	W 81–63	27–3	Louisiana Superdome (18,510); New Orleans, LA
March 15, 2003; 3:15 pm, JP Sports	(E1) No. 2	vs. (W2) Auburn; Semifinals	W 78–58	28–3	Louisiana Superdome (21,427); New Orleans, LA
March 16, 2003; 1:00 pm, CBS	(E1) No. 2	vs. (W1) Mississippi State; Championship Game	W 64–57	29–3	Louisiana Superdome (22,054); New Orleans, LA
2003 NCAA Tournament
March 21, 2003; 1:05 pm, CBS	(1 MW) No. 1	vs. (16 MW) IUPUI; First Round	W 95–64	30–3	Gaylord Entertainment Center (17,484); Nashville, TN
March 23, 2003; 1:05 pm, CBS	(1 MW) No. 1	vs. (9 MW) Utah; Second Round	W 74–54	31–3	Gaylord Entertainment Center (17,484); Nashville, TN
March 27, 2003; 7:15 pm, CBS	(1 MW) No. 1	vs. (5 MW) No. 21 Wisconsin; Sweet Sixteen	W 63–57	32–3	Hubert H. Humphrey Metrodome (28,168); Minneapolis, MN
March 29, 2003; 3:05 pm, CBS	(1 MW) No. 1	vs. (3 MW) No. 9 Marquette; Elite Eight	L 69–83	32–4	Hubert H. Humphrey Metrodome (28,383); Minneapolis, MN
*Non-conference game. ^{#}Rankings from AP Poll. (#) Tournament seedings in parentheses.

== Awards and honors ==
- Tubby Smith, Naismith College Coach of the Year

== Team players drafted into the NBA ==
Round	Pick	Player	NBA club
2	43	Keith Bogans	Milwaukee Bucks
