= 2002–03 Florida Gators men's basketball team =

American college basketball season

2002–03 Florida Gators men's basketball

Orange Bowl Classic Champion

NCAA tournament, Round of 32
- Conference: Southeastern Conference
- East

Ranking
- Coaches: No. 16
- AP: No. 10
- Record: 25–8 (12–4 SEC)
- Head coach: Billy Donovan
- Home arena: O'Connell Center

2002–03 Southeastern Conference men's basketball standings
	Conf.				Overall
Team	W		L	PCT	W		L	PCT
East
No. 1 Kentucky †	16	–	0	1.000	32	–	4	.889
No. 10 Florida	12	–	4	.750	25	–	8	.758
No. 25 Georgia	11	–	5	.688	19	–	8	.704
Tennessee	9	–	7	.563	17	–	12	.586
South Carolina	5	–	11	.313	12	–	16	.429
Vanderbilt	3	–	13	.188	11	–	18	.379
West
No. 20 Mississippi State	9	–	7	.563	21	–	10	.677
Auburn	8	–	8	.500	22	–	12	.647
LSU	8	–	8	.500	21	–	11	.656
Alabama	7	–	9	.438	17	–	12	.586
Ole Miss	4	–	12	.250	14	–	15	.483
Arkansas	4	–	12	.250	9	–	19	.321
† 2003 SEC tournament winner Rankings from AP Poll

The 2002–03 Florida Gators men's basketball team represented the University of Florida during the 2002–03 college basketball season.

On December 21, 2002, Florida defeated Miami in the Orange Bowl Basketball Classic, 94-93 in 2OT.

The Gators finished with a 25-8 record. Florida lost in the SEC tournament first round to Louisiana State 65-61. In the 2003 NCAA tournament, they defeated #15 Sam Houston 85-55 on March 21, 2003. In the Round of 32, they lost to #7 Michigan State 68-46 on March 23, 2003.
