= John Begzos =

John Begzos (April 7, 1942 – September 1, 2004) was an American sports executive who served as general manager of the San Antonio Spurs and Kansas City Kings.

== Early life ==
Begzos was born on April 7, 1942, in Detroit to John and Laura Begtzos. He graduated from Walled Lake High School in 1960. He then worked as an assistant golf professional and studied at Michigan State University until 1967, when he joined the United States Army. He served in the 196th Light Infantry Brigade of the Americal Division during the Vietnam War and was awarded three Purple Hearts, the Bronze Star Medal with the "V" device, and the Silver Star. After receiving a medical discharge he returned to Michigan State and received his accounting degree.

== Career ==
Begzos began his career as a ticket manager for the Oklahoma City 89ers. He then served as the general manager of the San Antonio Brewers. In 1973 he was named the Texas League's executive of the year. When the Dallas Chaparrals of the American Basketball Association moved to San Antonio, Begzos became the team's sales manager. The team struggled to draw fans early on due to the area's unfamiliarity with basketball and a strike that delayed the start of the team's first season. In order to draw fans, Begzos offered Larry Braun and David Boyle, two local sports fans he knew from his time with the Brewers, discounted seats if they could help bring in fans. The pair formed the Baseline Bums and placed in ad in the local newspaper for "loud beer drinkers" to join their group. The Bums were, according to Pat Putnam of Sports Illustrated "basketball's loudest and frequently most profane cheerleaders". The Spurs ended up averaging 6,594 spectators a game during their first season.

General manager Jack Ankerson left the team after the inaugural season to take the same job with the Virginia Squires and Bergzos was chosen to succeed him. He held this position for five seasons, during which time the Spurs made the playoffs every year and were one of the four of the remaining six accepted into the National Basketball Association as part of the ABA–NBA merger. By his final season as GM, the team's average attendance per game had risen to just under 12,000.

In 1979, Begzos left the Spurs to become executive vice president and general manager of the Kansas City Kings. During his first season as GM, Begzos acquired Mike Green, Len Elmore, and Ernie Grunfeld, but the Kings were unable to repeat as Midwest Division champions and lost in the first round of the playoffs to the Phoenix Suns. The following year, Begzos signed free agent Leon Douglas, traded for seven-time All Star JoJo White, and negotiated a long-term contract with Coach Cotton Fitzsimmons. The Kings got off to a 5–6 start and on October 29, 1980, the team fired Begzos. On November 7, 1980, Begzos' attorney confirmed a Kansas City Star report that his client had been fired over postage stamp reuse. According to the lawyer, Begzos had purchased $240 worth of stamps from a neighbor for $120. Begzos then sold the stamps to the team for what he had paid for them. Once postal inspectors informed the team of the situation, Kings' president H. Paul Rosenberg demanded Begzos resign. When he refused, Begzos was fired.

== Later life ==
After leaving the Kings, Begzos found employment with a Buffalo-based cable television company and moved to Amherst, New York. In 1982 he was pleaded guilty to theft charges stemming from the 1980 sale of his burned Alamo Heights home. Begzos had accepted a down payment from Richard Squires and a note for a future payment of $20,000 plus interest. Begzos sold the note to the Traders Bank of Kansas City but never told Squires, who sent Begzos a check for $22,000 on September 19, 1981. Begzos cashed the check and did not use the money to pay the note. After Squires was approached by the bank for the money, he notified the Bexar County district attorneys office, who charged Begzos with theft over $10,000. Begzos reached a deal that reduced the charges to a misdemeanor after he agreed to give the bank possession of a home he owned in Overland Park, Kansas. He sentenced to one year of probation.

In 1988, Begzos returned to Texas. He resided in Plano and owned a sports bar in Addison. He died on September 1, 2004.
