= 2002–03 Alabama Crimson Tide men's basketball team =

American college basketball season

2002–03 Alabama Crimson Tide men's basketball

NCAA tournament, first round
- Conference: Southeastern Conference
- Western Division
- Record: 17–12 (7–9 SEC)
- Head coach: Mark Gottfried (5th season)
- Assistant coaches: Philip Pearson; Orlando Early; Sammy Jackson
- Home arena: Coleman Coliseum (Capacity: 15,316)

2002–03 Southeastern Conference men's basketball standings
	Conf.				Overall
Team	W		L	PCT	W		L	PCT
East
No. 1 Kentucky †	16	–	0	1.000	32	–	4	.889
No. 10 Florida	12	–	4	.750	25	–	8	.758
No. 25 Georgia	11	–	5	.688	19	–	8	.704
Tennessee	9	–	7	.563	17	–	12	.586
South Carolina	5	–	11	.313	12	–	16	.429
Vanderbilt	3	–	13	.188	11	–	18	.379
West
No. 20 Mississippi State	9	–	7	.563	21	–	10	.677
Auburn	8	–	8	.500	22	–	12	.647
LSU	8	–	8	.500	21	–	11	.656
Alabama	7	–	9	.438	17	–	12	.586
Ole Miss	4	–	12	.250	14	–	15	.483
Arkansas	4	–	12	.250	9	–	19	.321
† 2003 SEC tournament winner Rankings from AP Poll

The 2002–03 Alabama Crimson Tide men's basketball team (variously "Alabama", "UA", "Bama" or "The Tide") represented the University of Alabama in the 2002–03 college basketball season. The head coach was Mark Gottfried, who was in his fifth season at Alabama. The team played its home games at Coleman Coliseum in Tuscaloosa, Alabama and was a member of the Southeastern Conference. This was the 91st season of basketball in the school's history. The Crimson Tide finished the season 17–12, 7–9 in SEC play, lost in the first round of the 2003 SEC men's basketball tournament. They were invited to the NCAA tournament but lost in the first round.

== Roster ==
#	Name	Class	Position	Height	Weight	Home Town
1	Chuck Davis	Freshman	Guard	6–3	230	Selma, AL
2	Emmett Thomas	Junior	Forward	6–4	205	Birmingham, AL
3	Kennedy Winston	Freshman	Forward	6–7	230	Prichard, AL
4	Reggie Rambo	Junior	Forward	6–7	225	Lena, LA
5	Earnest Shelton	Sophomore	Guard	6–3	215	Memphis, TN
13	Lucky Williams	Freshman	Forward	6–6	210	Nigeria, AL
14	Terrance Meade	Senior	Guard	6–2	190	Scottsboro, AL
21	Evan Brock	Freshman	Forward	6–9	210	Roswell, GA
23	Demetrius Smith	Junior	Guard	6–3	210	Hogansville, GA
24	Jason Reese	Sophomore	Guard	6–2	215	Birmingham, AL
25	Mo Williams	Sophomore	Guard	6–1	185	Jackson, MS
35	Erwin Dudley	Senior	Forward	6–8	240	Uniontown, AL
42	Kenny Walker	Senior	Forward	6–9	220	Jacksonville, FL
50	Antoine Pettway	Junior	Guard	6–0	170	Camden, AL

== Schedule and results ==
Date time, TV	Rank^{#}	Opponent^{#}	Result	Record	Site (attendance) city, state
Exhibition
November 1, 2002*; 7:00 p.m.		EA Sports	W 97–94		Coleman Coliseum; Tuscaloosa, AL
November 7, 2002*; 7:00 p.m.		Athletes in Action	W 72–71		Coleman Coliseum; Tuscaloosa, AL
Non-conference regular season
November 14, 2002*; 8:30 p.m.	No. 8	vs. No. 3 Oklahoma; Coaches vs. Cancer Classic	W 68–62	1–0	Madison Square Garden (8,826); New York, NY
November 22, 2002*; 7:00 p.m.	No. 4	Alabama State	W 82–56	2–0	Coleman Coliseum (9,316); Tuscaloosa, AL
November 25, 2002*; 7:00 p.m.	No. 4	Middle Tennessee	W 80–65	3–0	Coleman Coliseum (8,097); Tuscaloosa, AL
November 29, 2002*; 6:00 p.m.	No. 4	vs. Ohio State; Basketball Hall of Fame Classic	W 54–48	4–0	Springfield Civic Center (7,279); Springfield, MA
December 3, 2002*; 7:30 p.m.	No. 3	UNC Greensboro	W 89–61	5–0	Coleman Coliseum (8,529); Tuscaloosa, AL
December 7, 2002*; 1:00 p.m.	No. 3	St. Bonaventure	W 77–68	6–0	Coleman Coliseum (8,843); Tuscaloosa, AL
December 14, 2002*; 5:00 p.m.	No. 2	vs. Bowling Green; Coors Classic	W 72–63	7–0	Mitchell Center (9,668); Mobile, AL
December 21, 2002*; 2:00 p.m.	No. 2	vs. Providence	W 69–61	8–0	Coleman Coliseum (10,394); Tuscaloosa, AL
December 23, 2002*; 7:00 p.m.	No. 1	Morehead State	W 82–64	9–0	Coleman Coliseum (10,560); Tuscaloosa, AL
December 30, 2002*; 8:00 p.m.	No. 1	at Utah	L 49–51	9–1	Jon M. Huntsman Center (14,665); Salt Lake City, UT
January 4, 2003*; 4:00 p.m.	No. 1	No. 19 Xavier	W 65–58	10–1	Coleman Coliseum (15,316); Tuscaloosa, AL
SEC regular season
January 8, 2003; 7:00 p.m.	No. 4	Arkansas	W 61–51	11–1 (1–0)	Coleman Coliseum (12,088); Tuscaloosa, AL
January 11, 2003; 8:00 p.m.	No. 4	at Vanderbilt	L 69–70	11–2 (1–1)	Memorial Gymnasium (12,514); Nashville, TN
January 15, 2003; 7:00 p.m.	No. 9	No. 14 Mississippi State	W 68–62 ^{OT}	12–2 (2–1)	Coleman Coliseum (13,573); Tuscaloosa, AL
January 18, 2003; 3:00 p.m.	No. 9	at Auburn; Iron Bowl of Basketball	L 68–77	12–3 (2–2)	Beard-Eaves-Memorial Coliseum (10,500); Auburn, AL
January 21, 2003; 8:00 p.m.	No. 15	at Ole Miss	L 57–76	12–4 (2–3)	Tad Smith Coliseum (8,206); Oxford, MS
January 25, 2003; 7:00 p.m.	No. 15	No. 8 Kentucky	L 46–63	12–5 (2–4)	Coleman Coliseum (15,316); Tuscaloosa, AL
February 1, 2003; 4:00 p.m.	No. 23	LSU	W 75–66	13–5 (3–4)	Coleman Coliseum (15,316); Tuscaloosa, AL
February 5, 2003; 7:00 p.m.	No. 22	at Arkansas	L 70–81	13–6 (3–5)	Bud Walton Arena (17,026); Fayetteville, Arkansas
February 8, 2003; 12:00 p.m.	No. 22	at No. 1 Florida	L 56–75	13–7 (3–6)	O'Connell Center (12,101); Gainesville, FL
February 15, 2003; 7:30 p.m.		Auburn; Iron Bowl of Basketball	W 84–68	14–7 (4–6)	Coleman Coliseum (15,316); Tuscaloosa, AL
February 18, 2003; 8:00 p.m.		No. 22 Georgia	L 69–74	14–8 (4–7)	Coleman Coliseum (11,715); Tuscaloosa, AL
February 22, 2003; 1:00 p.m.		at Tennessee	W 76–71	15–8 (5–7)	Thompson–Boling Arena (16,014); Knoxville, TN
February 26, 2003; 7:00 p.m.		at No. 20 Mississippi State	L 55–59	15–9 (5–8)	Humphrey Coliseum (9,331); Starkville, MS
March 2, 2003; 1:00 p.m.		Ole Miss	W 86–63	16–9 (6–8)	Coleman Coliseum (11,968); Tuscaloosa, AL
March 5, 2003; 7:00 p.m.		South Carolina	W 82–59	17–9 (7–8)	Coleman Coliseum (10,316); Tuscaloosa, AL
March 8, 2003; 1:00 p.m.		at LSU	L 62–66	17–10 (7–9)	Pete Maravich Assembly Center (12,822); Baton Rouge, LA
SEC tournament
March 13, 2003; 7:30 p.m.	(W4)	vs. (E5) Vanderbilt; First Round	L 69–82	17–11	Louisiana Superdome (8,526); New Orleans, LA
NCAA tournament
March 21, 2003*; 9:30 pm	(10)	vs. (7) Indiana; First round	L 62–67	17–12	TD Garden (18,141); Boston, MA
*Non-conference game. ^{#}Rankings from AP Poll. (#) Tournament seedings in parentheses. All times are in Central Time.

== See also ==
- 2003 NCAA Division I men's basketball tournament
- 2002–03 NCAA Division I men's basketball season
- 2002–03 NCAA Division I men's basketball rankings
