= 2002–03 Auburn Tigers men's basketball team =

American college basketball season

2002–03 Auburn Tigers men's basketball

San Juan Shootout champions

NCAA tournament, Sweet Sixteen
- Conference: Southeastern Conference
- West
- Record: 22–12 (8–8 SEC)
- Head coach: Cliff Ellis (9th season)
- Captains: Marquis Daniels; Derrick Bird
- Home arena: Beard–Eaves–Memorial Coliseum

2002–03 Southeastern Conference men's basketball standings
	Conf.				Overall
Team	W		L	PCT	W		L	PCT
East
No. 1 Kentucky †	16	–	0	1.000	32	–	4	.889
No. 10 Florida	12	–	4	.750	25	–	8	.758
No. 25 Georgia	11	–	5	.688	19	–	8	.704
Tennessee	9	–	7	.563	17	–	12	.586
South Carolina	5	–	11	.313	12	–	16	.429
Vanderbilt	3	–	13	.188	11	–	18	.379
West
No. 20 Mississippi State	9	–	7	.563	21	–	10	.677
Auburn	8	–	8	.500	22	–	12	.647
LSU	8	–	8	.500	21	–	11	.656
Alabama	7	–	9	.438	17	–	12	.586
Ole Miss	4	–	12	.250	14	–	15	.483
Arkansas	4	–	12	.250	9	–	19	.321
† 2003 SEC tournament winner Rankings from AP Poll

The 2002–03 Auburn Tigers men's basketball team represented Auburn University in the 2002–03 college basketball season. The team's head coach was Cliff Ellis, who was in his ninth season at Auburn. The team played their home games at Beard–Eaves–Memorial Coliseum in Auburn, Alabama. They finished the season 22–12, 8–8 in SEC play. They defeated Tennessee to advance to the semifinals of the SEC tournament where they lost to Kentucky. They received an at-large bid to the NCAA tournament where they defeated Saint Joseph's and Wake Forest to advance to the Sweet Sixteen where they lost to Syracuse.

== Roster ==
2002–03 Auburn Tigers men's basketball team
Players
Coaches

Pos.	#	Name	Height	Weight	Year	Previous school	Hometown
G	3	Marquis Daniels	6 ft 6 in (1.98 m)	195 lb (88 kg)	Sr	Mount Zion Christian Academy	Orlando, Florida
F	4	Marco Killingsworth	6 ft 8 in (2.03 m)	—	So
G	5	Steve Leven	6 ft 5 in (1.96 m)	—	Fr
G	10	Troy Gaines	5 ft 11 in (1.8 m)	—	So
G	11	Derrick Bird	6 ft 4 in (1.93 m)	—	Sr
G	13	Brandon Robinson	6 ft 8 in (2.03 m)	—	So
G	15	Danny Wicke	6 ft 5 in (1.96 m)	—	Fr
G	22	Lewis Monroe	6 ft 5 in (1.96 m)	—	So
G	24	Nathan Watson	6 ft 3 in (1.91 m)	—	So
G	30	Jamaal Arnold	6 ft 2 in (1.88 m)	—	Jr
F	32	Rodney Tucker	6 ft 8 in (2.03 m)	—	Jr
F	33	Donny Calton	6 ft 6 in (1.98 m)	—	Sr
C	34	Kyle Davis	6 ft 8 in (2.03 m)	—	Jr
G	35	Johnathan Lewis	6 ft 2 in (1.88 m)	—	Sr
G	55	Chris Lollar	6 ft 0 in (1.83 m)	—	Jr

Head coach

- Cliff Ellis (Florida State)

Assistant coach(es)

Legend

- (C) Team captain
- (S) Suspended
- (I) Ineligible
- (W) Walk-on
- Injured
- Current redshirt

Roster
Last update: 9 December 2016

== Schedule and results ==
Date time, TV	Rank^{#}	Opponent^{#}	Result	Record	High points	High rebounds	High assists	Site (attendance) city, state
Exhibition
October 31, 2002*; 7:00 pm		Global Sports All-Stars	W 90–70		19 – Davis	8 – Tied	6 – Tied	Beard–Eaves–Memorial Coliseum (3,500); Auburn, AL
November 15, 2002*; 7:00 pm		EA Sports All-Stars	W 72–56		16 – Gaines	8 – Tied	5 – Monroe	Beard–Eaves–Memorial Coliseum (4,000); Auburn, AL
Regular season
November 22, 2002*; 7:00 pm		Wofford	W 81–63	1–0	15 – Daniels	10 – Killingsworth	5 – Daniels	Beard–Eaves–Memorial Coliseum (6,000); Auburn, AL
November 26, 2002*; 7:00 pm, CSS		Georgia State	W 100–71	2–0	27 – Daniels	10 – Daniels	7 – Daniels	Beard–Eaves–Memorial Coliseum (6,000); Auburn, AL
December 1, 2002*; 2:00 pm		vs. Western Kentucky	L 70–89	2–1	21 – Killingsworth	5 – Tied	5 – Daniels	Gaylord Entertainment Center (6,589); Nashville, TN
December 2, 2002*; 7:00 pm		Southeastern Louisiana	W 77–47	3–1	22 – Daniels	12 – Davis	5 – Bird	Beard–Eaves–Memorial Coliseum (6,000); Auburn, AL
December 4, 2002*; 8:00 pm, CSS		South Carolina State	W 85–65	4–1	17 – Killingsworth	10 – Davis	7 – Monroe	Beard–Eaves–Memorial Coliseum (6,000); Auburn, AL
December 8, 2002*; 3:00 pm, FSS		Rutgers	W 82–70	5–1	23 – Killingsworth	12 – Daniels	7 – Daniels	Beard–Eaves–Memorial Coliseum (6,000); Auburn, AL
December 14, 2002*; 3:00 pm		Murray State	W 72–53	6–1	24 – Daniels	11 – Daniels	4 – Monroe	Beard–Eaves–Memorial Coliseum (6,000); Auburn, AL
December 17, 2002*; 7:00 pm		Western Michigan	L 54–72	6–2	18 – Daniels	12 – Killingsworth	4 – Daniels	Beard–Eaves–Memorial Coliseum (6,000); Auburn, AL
December 20, 2002*; 4:30 pm		at Puerto Rico–Mayagüez; San Juan Shootout quarterfinal	W 94–64	7–2	18 – Killingsworth	9 – Tied	4 – Monroe	Mario Morales Coliseum (200); Caguas, P.R.
December 21, 2002*; 4:30 pm		vs. Denver; San Juan Shootout semifinal	W 63–58	8–2	19 – Watson	9 – Daniels	4 – Daniels	Mario Morales Coliseum (200); Caguas, P.R
December 22, 2002*; 4:30 pm		vs. Troy State; San Juan Shootout championship	W 94–66	9–2	38 – Daniels	9 – Tied	4 – Monroe	Mario Morales Coliseum (300); Caguas, P.R
December 30, 2002*; 7:00 pm		Southern Miss	W 92–46	10–2	21 – Daniels	8 – Daniels	6 – Monroe	Beard–Eaves–Memorial Coliseum (6,000); Auburn, AL
January 2, 2003*; 7:00 pm		North Texas	W 90–65	11–2	17 – Daniels	11 – Killingsworth	8 – Monroe	Beard–Eaves–Memorial Coliseum (6,000); Auburn, AL
January 8, 2003; 7:00 pm		Vanderbilt	W 62–59	12–2 (1–0)	18 – Killingsworth	6 – Watson	3 – Tied	Beard–Eaves–Memorial Coliseum (7,189); Auburn, AL
January 11, 2003; 2:00 pm		at Arkansas	W 52–37	13–2 (2–0)	11 – Bird	9 – Killingsworth	2 – Tied	Bud Walton Arena (18,473); Fayetteville, AR
January 15, 2003; 6:30 pm		at South Carolina	W 67–60	14–2 (3–0)	31 – Daniels	7 – Tied	3 – Tied	Carolina Center (13,962); Columbia, SC
January 18, 2003; 3:00 pm, JP		No. 9 Alabama; Rivalry	W 77–68	15–2 (4–0)	13 – Tied	6 – Killingsworth	5 – Tied	Beard–Eaves–Memorial Coliseum (10,500); Auburn, AL
January 22, 2003; 6:00 pm, FSS	No. 24	at No. 8 Kentucky	L 51–67	15–3 (4–1)	19 – Killingsworth	8 – Daniels	3 – Monroe	Rupp Arena (21,554); Lexington, KY
January 25, 2003; 12:00 pm, JP	No. 24	at No. 19 Georgia	L 79–85	15–4 (4–2)	25 – Robinson	9 – Robinson	6 – Monroe	Stegeman Coliseum (10,523); Athens, GA
February 1, 2003; 3:00 pm		Tennessee	L 57–60	15–5 (4–3)	15 – Tied	6 – Daniels	4 – Watson	Beard–Eaves–Memorial Coliseum (8,854); Auburn, AL
February 5, 2003; 7:00 pm		Ole Miss	W 77–71	16–5 (5–3)	20 – Daniels	10 – Davis	4 – Monroe	Beard–Eaves–Memorial Coliseum (6,874); Auburn, AL
February 8, 2003; 3:00 pm		LSU	W 56–54	17–5 (6–3)	15 – Daniels	12 – Killingsworth	4 – Daniels	Beard–Eaves–Memorial Coliseum (9,149); Auburn, AL
February 15, 2003; 7:00 pm, PPV		at Alabama; Rivalry	L 68–84	17–6 (6–4)	23 – Daniels	9 – Killingsworth	2 – Tied	Coleman Coliseum (15,316); Tuscaloosa, AL
February 19, 2003; 7:00 pm		No. 19 Mississippi State	L 46–63	17–7 (6–5)	17 – Daniels	11 – Davis	4 – Monroe	Beard–Eaves–Memorial Coliseum (8,280); Auburn, AL
February 22, 2003; 4:00 pm, FSS		at Ole Miss	W 80–75	18–7 (7–5)	29 – Daniels	6 – Daniels	4 – Daniels	Tad Smith Coliseum (6,016); Oxford, MS
February 26, 2003; 7:00 pm		at LSU	L 63–94	18–8 (7–6)	18 – Gaines	4 – Tied	3 – Lollar	Pete Maravich Assembly Center (8,078); Baton Rouge, LA
March 1, 2003; 1:00 pm, JP		No. 4 Florida	L 70–73	18–9 (7–7)	21 – Bird	9 – Davis	4 – Tied	Beard–Eaves–Memorial Coliseum (9,334); Auburn, AL
March 5, 2003; 7:00 pm		Arkansas	W 69–54	19–9 (8–7)	20 – Bird	7 – Daniels	5 – Tied	Beard–Eaves–Memorial Coliseum (6,814); Auburn, AL
March 8, 2003; 1:00 pm, JP		at No. 23 Mississippi State	L 45–67	19–10 (8–8)	14 – Tied	9 – Davis	3 – Watson	Humphrey Coliseum (9,733); Starkville, MS
SEC tournament
March 14, 2003; 8:45 pm, JP	(W2)	vs. (E3) Tennessee; Quarterfinals	W 66–53	20–10	17 – Killingsworth	10 – Killingsworth	4 – Tied	Louisiana Superdome (18,510); New Orleans, LA
March 15, 2003; 2:25 pm, JP	(W2)	vs. (E1) No. 2 Kentucky; Semifinals	L 58–78	20–11	19 – Robinson	9 – Robinson	5 – Daniels	Louisiana Superdome (21,427); New Orleans, LA
NCAA tournament
March 21, 2003*; 11:25 am, CBS	(10)	vs. (7) Saint Joseph's; First Round	W 65–63 ^{OT}	21–11	25 – Daniels	9 – Davis	4 – Tied	St. Pete Times Forum; Tampa, FL
March 23, 2003*; 3:30 pm, CBS	(10)	vs. (2) No. 8 Wake Forest; Second Round	W 68–62	22–11	18 – Daniels	8 – Killingsworth	3 – Tied	St. Pete Times Forum; Tampa, FL
March 28, 2003*; 8:40 pm, CBS	(10)	vs. (3) No. 13 Syracuse; Sweet Sixteen	L 78–79	22–12	27 – Daniels	9 – Tied	5 – Bird	Pepsi Arena (15,093); Albany, NY
*Non-conference game. ^{#}Rankings from AP Poll. (#) Tournament seedings in parentheses. All times are in Central Time.
