= 2002–03 Arkansas Razorbacks men's basketball team =

American college basketball season

2002–03 Arkansas Razorbacks men's basketball
- Conference: Southeastern Conference
- West
- Record: 9–19 (4–12 SEC)
- Head coach: Stan Heath (1st season)
- Home arena: Bud Walton Arena

2002–03 Southeastern Conference men's basketball standings
	Conf.				Overall
Team	W		L	PCT	W		L	PCT
East
No. 1 Kentucky †	16	–	0	1.000	32	–	4	.889
No. 10 Florida	12	–	4	.750	25	–	8	.758
No. 25 Georgia	11	–	5	.688	19	–	8	.704
Tennessee	9	–	7	.563	17	–	12	.586
South Carolina	5	–	11	.313	12	–	16	.429
Vanderbilt	3	–	13	.188	11	–	18	.379
West
No. 20 Mississippi State	9	–	7	.563	21	–	10	.677
Auburn	8	–	8	.500	22	–	12	.647
LSU	8	–	8	.500	21	–	11	.656
Alabama	7	–	9	.438	17	–	12	.586
Ole Miss	4	–	12	.250	14	–	15	.483
Arkansas	4	–	12	.250	9	–	19	.321
† 2003 SEC tournament winner Rankings from AP Poll

The 2002–03 Arkansas Razorbacks men's basketball team represented the University of Arkansas in the 2002–03 college basketball season. The head coach was Stan Heath, serving for his first year. The team played its home games in Bud Walton Arena in Fayetteville, Arkansas.

== Schedule ==
Date time, TV	Rank^{#}	Opponent^{#}	Result	Record	Site (attendance) city, state
11/22/02*; 7:35 pm		Jackson State	W 81–44	1–0	Bud Walton Arena (16,845); Fayetteville, Arkansas
11/26/02*; 7:05 pm		at Oral Roberts	L 64–76	1–1	Mabee Center (8,837); Tulsa, Oklahoma
11/30/02*; 4:05 pm, ARSN		No. 22 Tulsa	L 60–61	1–2	Bud Walton Arena (16,473); Fayetteville, Arkansas
12/3/02*; 7:05 pm, ARSN		Troy State	L 66–74	1–3	Bud Walton Arena (8,138); Fayetteville, Arkansas
12/7/02*; 11:30 am, ESPN2		No. 20 Illinois	L 58–62	1–4	Alltel Arena (9,756); Little Rock, Arkansas
12/10/02*; 7:05 pm, ARSN		Louisiana Tech	W 72–60	2–4	Bud Walton Arena (10,611); Fayetteville, Arkansas
12/18/02*; 7:05 pm, ARSN		Sam Houston State	W 78–67	3–4	Bud Walton Arena (9,368); Fayetteville, Arkansas
12/21/02*; 12:30 pm, ARSN		SW Texas State	W 70–60	4–4	Bud Walton Arena (9,640); Fayetteville, Arkansas
12/28/02*; 7:05 pm, ARSN		Centenary	W 75–51	5–4	Bud Walton Arena (11,738); Fayetteville, Arkansas
12/30/02*; 7:00 pm, ARSN		at Oklahoma State	L 45–71	5–5	Gallagher-Iba Arena (13,611); Stillwater, Oklahoma
1/2/03*; 7:00 pm, FSN		Memphis	L 67–72	5–6	Bud Walton Arena (17,184); Fayetteville, Arkansas
1/8/03; 7:00 pm		at No. 4 Alabama	L 51–61	5–7	Coleman Coliseum (12,088); Tuscaloosa, AL
1/11/03; 2:05 pm		Auburn	L 37–52	5–8	Bud Walton Arena (18,473); Fayetteville, Arkansas
1/18/03; 5:05 pm, FSN		No. 20 Georgia	L 64–81	5–9	Bud Walton Arena (17,766); Fayetteville, Arkansas
1/22/03; 7:05 pm		LSU	W 73–65	6–9	Bud Walton Arena (15,104); Fayetteville, Arkansas
1/25/03; 5:00 pm, FSN		at Mississippi	L 54–73	6–10	Tad Smith Coliseum (8,784); Oxford, Mississippi
2/1/03; 12:00 pm, JP Sports		at No. 4 Florida	L 66–77	6–11	O'Connell Center (12,386); Gainesville, Florida
2/5/03; 7:05 pm, JP Sports		No. 22 Alabama	W 81–70	7–11	Bud Walton Arena (17,026); Fayetteville, Arkansas
2/8/03; 4:00 pm, FSN		at No. 23 Mississippi State	L 54–84	7–12	Humphrey Coliseum (8,460); Starkville, Mississippi
2/12/03; 7:05 pm, JP Sports		Tennessee	L 62–70	7–13	Bud Walton Arena (15,240); Fayetteville, Arkansas
2/15/03; 12:00 pm, JP Sports		at South Carolina	L 65–72	7–14	Colonial Center (9,065); Columbia, South Carolina
2/19/03; 7:05 pm, JP Sports		No. 2 Kentucky	L 50–66	7–15	Bud Walton Arena (18,813); Fayetteville, Arkansas
2/22/03; 7:00 pm		at LSU	L 56–75	7–16	Maravich Assembly Center (6,167); Baton Rouge, Louisiana
2/26/03; 7:00 pm		at Vanderbilt	W 60–50	8–16	Memorial Gymnasium (9,681); Nashville, Tennessee
3/1/03; 3:00 pm, JP Sports		No. 20 Mississippi State	W 53–51	9–16	Bud Walton Arena (16,983); Fayetteville, Arkansas
3/5/03; 7:00 pm		at Auburn	L 54–69	9–17	Beard-Eaves-Memorial Coliseum (6,814); Auburn, AL
3/8/03; 2:00 pm		Mississippi	L 54–64	9–18	Bud Walton Arena (17,236); Fayetteville, Arkansas
2003 SEC men's basketball tournament
3/13/03; 2:15 pm, JP Sports		vs. LSU	L 56–83	9–19	Louisiana Superdome (11,430); New Orleans
*Non-conference game. ^{#}Rankings from AP Poll. (#) Tournament seedings in parentheses.
