= 2002–03 Mississippi State Bulldogs men's basketball team =

American college basketball season

2002–03 Mississippi State Bulldogs men's basketball

SEC West Champions

NCAA tournament, first round
- Conference: Southeastern Conference

Ranking
- AP: No. 20
- Record: 21–10 (10–6 SEC)
- Head coach: Rick Stansbury (5th season)
- Assistant coaches: Phil Cunningham; Robert Kirby; Mark White
- Home arena: Humphrey Coliseum

2002–03 Southeastern Conference men's basketball standings
	Conf.				Overall
Team	W		L	PCT	W		L	PCT
East
No. 1 Kentucky †	16	–	0	1.000	32	–	4	.889
No. 10 Florida	12	–	4	.750	25	–	8	.758
No. 25 Georgia	11	–	5	.688	19	–	8	.704
Tennessee	9	–	7	.563	17	–	12	.586
South Carolina	5	–	11	.313	12	–	16	.429
Vanderbilt	3	–	13	.188	11	–	18	.379
West
No. 20 Mississippi State	9	–	7	.563	21	–	10	.677
Auburn	8	–	8	.500	22	–	12	.647
LSU	8	–	8	.500	21	–	11	.656
Alabama	7	–	9	.438	17	–	12	.586
Ole Miss	4	–	12	.250	14	–	15	.483
Arkansas	4	–	12	.250	9	–	19	.321
† 2003 SEC tournament winner Rankings from AP Poll

The 2002–03 Mississippi State basketball team represented Mississippi State University as a member of the Southeastern Conference during the 2002–03 college basketball season. Under fifth-year head coach Rick Stansbury, the team played their home games at Humphrey Coliseum in Starkville, Mississippi. Mississippi State won the SEC West Division regular season title. The Bulldogs reached the championship game of the SEC tournament, losing to Kentucky. The team received an at-large bid to the NCAA tournament as No. 5 seed in the East region. The Bulldogs were upset by No. 12 seed Butler in the opening round, 47–46. Mississippi State finished the season with a record of 21–10 (9–7 SEC).

== Roster ==
2002–03 Mississippi State Bulldogs men's basketball team
Players
Coaches

Pos.	#	Name	Height	Weight	Year	Previous school	Hometown
G	22	Derrick Zimmerman	6 ft 3 in (1.91 m)	195 lb (88 kg)	Sr	Wossman HS	Monroe, LA
G	15	Timmy Bowers	6 ft 2 in (1.88 m)	190 lb (86 kg)	Sr	Harrison Central HS	Gulfport, MS

Head coach

- Rick Stansbury (Campbellsville)

Assistant coach(es)

- Phil Cunningham (Campbellsville)
- Robert Kirby (UTPA)
- Mark White (Austin Peay)

Legend

- (C) Team captain
- (S) Suspended
- (I) Ineligible
- (W) Walk-on
- Injured
- Current redshirt

Roster

== Schedule and results ==
Date time, TV	Rank^{#}	Opponent^{#}	Result	Record	Site city, state
Non-conference Regular season
Dec 14, 2002*	No. 24	vs. No. 13 Xavier	W 71–61	6–1	Madison Square Garden; New York, New York
SEC Regular season
SEC Tournament
Mar 14, 2003*		vs. Ole Miss; Quarterfinals	W 73–64	20–8	Louisiana Superdome; New Orleans, Louisiana
Mar 15, 2003*		vs. LSU; Semifinals	W 76–61	21–8	Louisiana Superdome; New Orleans, Louisiana
Mar 16, 2003*		vs. No. 2 Kentucky; Championship game	L 57–64	21–9	Louisiana Superdome; New Orleans, Louisiana
NCAA Tournament
Mar 21, 2003*	(5 S) No. 20	vs. (12 S) Butler; First Round	L 46–47	21–10	Birmingham-Jefferson Civic Center; Birmingham, Alabama
*Non-conference game. ^{#}Rankings from AP poll. (#) Tournament seedings in parentheses. E=East.
