= 2003 SEC men's basketball tournament =

- Classification: Division I
- Season: 2002–03
- Teams: 11
- Site: Louisiana Superdome; New Orleans, Louisiana
- Champions: Kentucky (25th title)
- Winning coach: Tubby Smith (4th title)
- MVP: Keith Bogans, Kentucky
- Attendance: 172,840

2002–03 Southeastern Conference men's basketball standings
	Conf.				Overall
Team	W		L	PCT	W		L	PCT
East
No. 1 Kentucky †	16	–	0	1.000	32	–	4	.889
No. 10 Florida	12	–	4	.750	25	–	8	.758
No. 25 Georgia	11	–	5	.688	19	–	8	.704
Tennessee	9	–	7	.563	17	–	12	.586
South Carolina	5	–	11	.313	12	–	16	.429
Vanderbilt	3	–	13	.188	11	–	18	.379
West
No. 20 Mississippi State	9	–	7	.563	21	–	10	.677
Auburn	8	–	8	.500	22	–	12	.647
LSU	8	–	8	.500	21	–	11	.656
Alabama	7	–	9	.438	17	–	12	.586
Ole Miss	4	–	12	.250	14	–	15	.483
Arkansas	4	–	12	.250	9	–	19	.321
† 2003 SEC tournament winner Rankings from AP Poll

The 2003 SEC men's basketball tournament took place on March 13–16, 2003 in New Orleans at the Louisiana Superdome. Georgia did not participate; it had pulled out of the postseason as NCAA violations by coach Jim Harrick were emerging.

As shown in the bracket below, the designated berth for the Eastern division's sixth-seeded team was instead given to a Western division team, while the designated berth for the Western division's sixth-seeded team was left vacant.

Kentucky won the tournament and received the SEC's automatic bid to the NCAA tournament by beating Mississippi State on March 16, 2003.

== Bracket ==
First round
E4	South Carolina	56
W5	Ole Miss	62
W3	LSU	85
E6	Arkansas	56
W4	Alabama	69
E5	Vanderbilt	82
E3	Tennessee	1
W6	vacant	0

Second Round
W1	Mississippi State	73
W5	Ole Miss	64
E2	#7 Florida	61
W3	LSU	65
E1	#2 Kentucky	81
E5	Vanderbilt	63
W2	Auburn	66
E3	Tennessee	53

Semifinals
W1	Mississippi State	76
W3	LSU	61
E1	#2 Kentucky	78
W2	Auburn	58

Championship game
W1	Mississippi State	57
E1	#2 Kentucky	64
