= Jay McCreary =

American basketball player and coach

Biographical details
- Born: February 6, 1918; Elwood, Indiana, U.S.
- Died: April 17, 1995 (aged 77); Baton Rouge, Louisiana, U.S.

Playing career
- 1937–1941: Indiana
- Position: Guard

Coaching career (HC unless noted)
- 1947–1949: Indiana (assistant)
- 1949–1951: DePauw
- 1951–1957: Muncie Central HS
- 1957–1965: LSU
- 1966–1972: LSU (assistant)

Lawrence J. "Jay" McCreary (February 6, 1918 – April 17, 1995) was an American basketball player and coach. He won championships as a player in both high school and college, and as a high school coach in Indiana. McCreary also served as head coach at Louisiana State University.

== Playing career ==
Jay McCreary was an Indiana state All-Star as a guard at Frankfort High School, where he led the team to a State championship in 1936. Following his prep career, McCreary went to play for Indiana University and was a key player on the 1939–40 Indiana Hoosiers national championship team.

== Coaching career ==
After serving in the United States Army during World War II, McCreary returned to his alma mater as an assistant to his former coach, Branch McCracken. After two years he moved to DePauw University, then to Muncie Central High School, where he led the Bearcats to the 1952 state title. Two seasons later (1953–54), the Mighty Bearcats would fall to Milan High; later this loss would inspire the movie Hoosiers. From Muncie Central, McCreary was named head coach at LSU. In eight seasons (1957–1965), McCreary's teams went 82–115 (.416). He was succeeded in 1965 by Frank Truitt, but returned to Baton Rouge as an assistant in 1966, he served in this capacity for Truitt and Press Maravich until Maravich's firing in 1972.

== Personal life ==
Jay McCreary died on April 17, 1995.
