= Frank Truitt =

American basketball coach

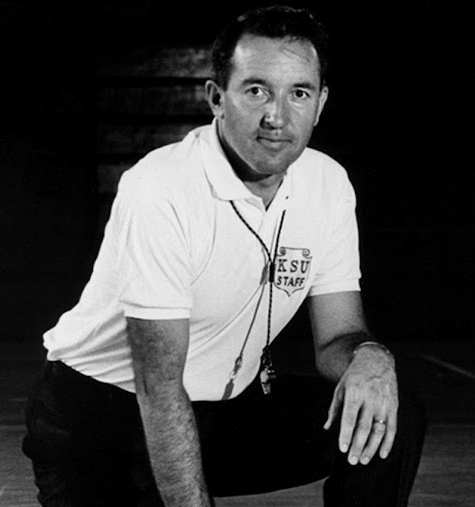

Biographical details
- Born: April 4, 1925; Columbus, Ohio, U.S.
- Died: December 21, 2014 (aged 89); Columbus, Ohio, U.S.
- Education: Otterbein '50; Ohio State '62

Coaching career (HC unless noted)
- 1958–1965: Ohio State (assistant)
- 1965–1966: LSU
- 1966–1978: Kent State

Frank Wilson Truitt, Jr., (April 4, 1925 – December 21, 2014) was an American multi-sport collegiate coach and a veteran of World War II.

Among his noteworthy accomplishments, Truitt engineered the historic upset of Jerry Lucas's Middletown Middies basketball team in the Ohio 1958 Division AA state semifinals and helped coach the Ohio State men's basketball team to the 1960 NCAA Championship.

== World War II ==
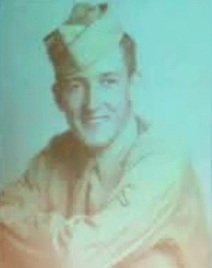
Frank Truitt in his Army uniform, 1944

After graduating from Worthington High School in 1943, Truitt served in the 282nd Engineer Combat Battalion as part of General George S. Patton's Third Army and eventually rose to the rank of Staff Sergeant. Truitt's battalion arrived in France on 25 December 1944 and saw action during the Battle of the Bulge while stationed in Luxembourg. The 282nd Engineers built "pontoon bridges, Bailey bridges, and rafts [that were] essential for rapidly moving large numbers of infantry and tanks over the numerous water obstacles."

== Otterbein University ==
Truitt enrolled at Otterbein University in 1946 after serving overseas in the United States Army for 32 months. While in college, Truitt helped found the Otterbein golf team, in addition to playing three years of varsity basketball. He married fellow student Katharine Ellen "Kay" Turner on 16 June 1948 before graduating with Bachelor of Science and Bachelor of Arts degrees in 1950. He majored in both History and Government.

== High school coach and teacher ==
"I told them in practice one day, 'Somebody is going to beat Middletown this year and I'll tell you what kind of team it will be: good on defense, a good shooting team that can make its foul shots.' I said, 'there was only one team in Ohio who could do that. And that's you guys.'"

"It got their attention."

— Frank Truitt, to his North High Polar Bears: 1957-58

From 1951 to 1954, Truitt taught History, Government, and French and was the head basketball coach at Bloomingburg High School in Fayette County, Ohio. His team won the county league title and the county tournament in both 1953 and 1954.

Truitt next taught and coached at Mount Gilead High School in Mount Gilead, Ohio. His 1954-55 team finished 20-4.

After a stop at Columbus West Junior High School to teach physical education and coach the basketball team, Truitt became a teacher and the head basketball coach at Columbus North High School in Columbus, Ohio.

In 1958, Truitt's 24-0 North High Polar Bears advanced to the Division AA state semifinals, where they encountered Paul Walker's 24-0 Middletown Middies. The Middies entered the semifinal matchup having won 76 straight games, including two consecutive state titles, and were led by future Ohio State Buckeye and NBA Hall of Famer Jerry Lucas, who was "generally considered the best high school player in the nation" and "the most heavily recruited high school player, with the possible exception of Wilt Chamberlain, to that time. A close contest the entire way, North trailed Middletown 48-43 as the game entered the fourth quarter in St. John Arena. North seized a 59-54 lead with just over a minute to play before Middletown made a furious comeback to take a 62-61 lead with ten seconds left. North's Eddie Clark drove past Jerry Lucas in the game's final seconds to score the game-winning layup and secure a 63-62 victory for the Polar Bears. It was an upset of historic proportions. In fact, some still consider North's victory over Middletown as "the biggest upset in Ohio high school basketball history."

The Polar Bears ultimately lost to Cleveland East Tech in the state championship game in the second and final (sudden-death) overtime, 50-48. North had been ahead 48-46 with six seconds remaining in regulation before Jim Stone hit a 35-footer for East Tech to send the game to overtime. Neither team scored in the first overtime. By the rules of the day, the second overtime was played as sudden-death. North captured the first possession in the second overtime but turned the ball over, enabling Gerald Warren to hit the game winner on East Tech's first possession in double overtime. The sudden-death format of the second overtime was retired following this game.

== Ohio State University ==
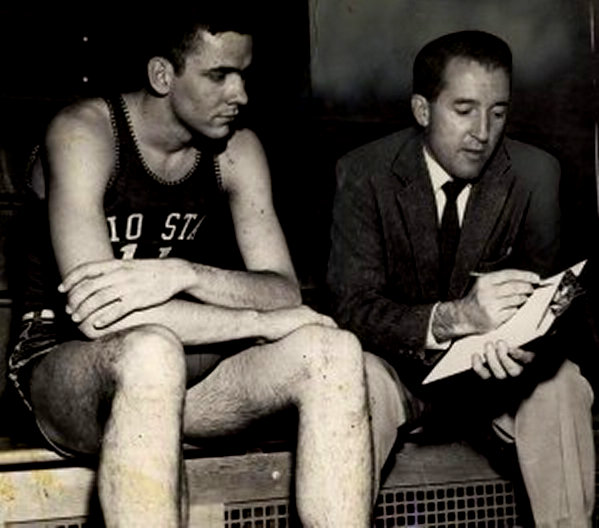
Frank Truitt with Jerry Lucas at Ohio State

Following the 1957-58 season with the Polar Bears, Truitt was, at least for the moment, named head basketball coach at Otterbein on 3 May 1958. But Floyd Stahl retired as Ohio State University's head basketball coach, prompting then-assistant Fred Taylor to assume the head coaching position at Ohio State. Taylor's promotion to head coach left the freshman coach's position vacant. Ultimately, Truitt had hoped to join the staff at Ohio State and conditionally accepted the Otterbein position. Said Truitt at the time, "I accepted the Otterbein position contingent on being released if the job at Ohio State opened up; it was actually written in the contract so there was no misunderstanding." The new appointment at Ohio State as the freshman coach under Taylor enabled Truitt to unite with Middletown's Jerry Lucas, who had previously committed to play at Ohio State. Also recruited to join the Buckeyes for the 1958-59 season were John Havlicek, Mel Nowell, and Bob Knight, among others.

"Your team is very well organized. Some day you'll coach an NCAA championship team."

— Frank Truitt to UCLA coach John Wooden after Ohio State defeated the Bruins 105-84 at the Sports Arena on 28 December 1961, to which Wooden replied, "Oh no, I will never be that lucky."

Wooden would later win a record 10 NCAA championships as coach of the Bruins.

The Ohio State basketball program enjoyed its most successful three-year stretch in program history shortly thereafter, in which it reached three consecutive NCAA championship games. The Buckeyes defeated the then-defending champion California Golden Bears 77-55 to win the 1960 NCAA Championship but lost to the Cincinnati Bearcats in the championship game in each of the next two seasons. To date, the 1960 NCAA Championship remains the only basketball national title in school history.

In those days, Truitt served not only as the freshman team's head coach, but also as an assistant to the varsity team, as the varsity team's lead scout, and as the chief recruiter. His "charm as a recruiter" helped Truitt recruit future AP Player of the Year Gary Bradds, and future All American Bill Hosket, Jr. among others. Once players were on campus as freshmen, Truitt was "responsible [for helping] them adjust to college life." Said Taylor, "[Frank] gave the kids the most precious gift one person can give another: he gave them time. He really cared about the players, and they knew that." Said Hosket, "Frank was the best teacher of individual skills I've ever been around.

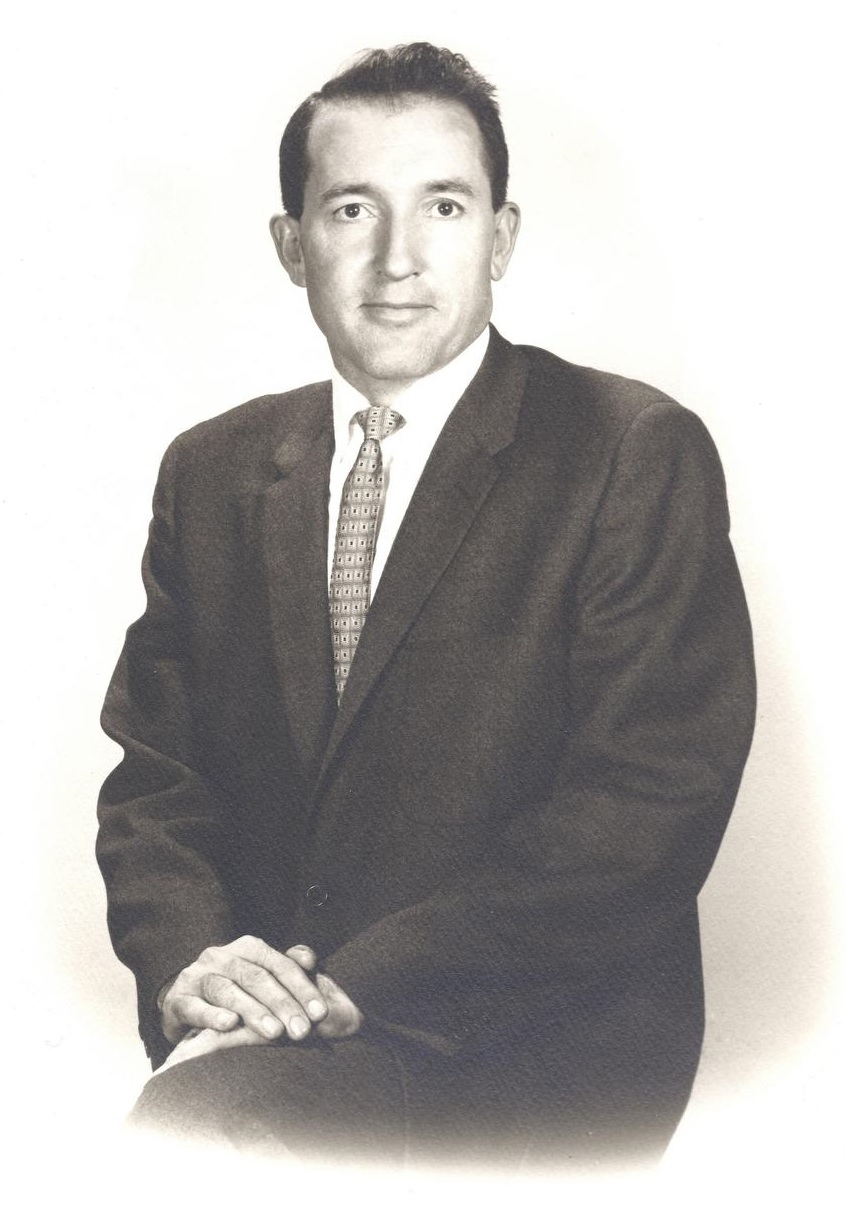
Frank Truitt, 1961

Also during this time, Truitt earned a master's degree in physical education from Ohio State in 1962. His office in St. John Arena was just down the hall from the office of Woody Hayes, the longtime coach of the Ohio State Buckeyes football team.

During the season, Truitt, who Taylor deemed to have "an extremely keen analytical basketball mind" often traveled around to scout other teams. In 2010, Bob Knight echoed Taylor's appraisal of Truitt's scouting abilities by claiming that Truitt was better at scouting than "anyone [he has] ever seen in [his] time in college basketball." Truitt's scouting of the California Golden Bears played an instrumental role in Ohio State's victory in the 1960 NCAA Championship game: in the words of Knight,

California . . . had a little guard named Bobby Wendell, who was not a good shooter. We just didn't guard him. Mel Nowell dropped off him, jammed things up inside, and the movement they were trying to get there was rendered ineffective. Wendell went 0-for-6. I thought at the time, as a player, what a great coaching move that was, and I copied it a lot over the years with my own teams. I asked [California head coach] Pete Newell later, and he said we were the first team to do that to them. This pointed out the value of preparation and the role of assistant coaches. Frank Truitt had suggested that after watching California game films.

In all, the Buckeyes won five straight Big Ten titles during Truitt's tenure as an assistant coach, which concluded with the 1964-65 season.

== Louisiana State University ==
Truitt resigned from his position at Ohio State University in 1965 to become the head coach of the LSU Tigers men's basketball team. He coached the Tigers for one year, during which his Tigers played against John Wooden's UCLA Bruins in Los Angeles and Adolph Rupp's Kentucky Wildcats in Lexington, among other teams. Future Naismith Memorial Basketball Hall of Fame coach Pat Riley played on that Kentucky Wildcat team and won the Southeastern Conference's Player of the Year Award that season. The state of the LSU basketball program was such that Truitt's 6-20 record that year was considered by some to be a "good start" for a head coach.

Ultimately, Truitt was unhappy at LSU for three primary reasons. As he later recalled, "When I went there they said that we could have a new arena in two years, that I could carry over my 17 years retirement from Ohio, and that I would be tenured on the faculty, like I was at Ohio State. None of that happened. The fourth reason was I just assumed I could recruit blacks and didn't think to ask before I took the job." While African American players like Mel Nowell and Joe Roberts played important roles for the Buckeye teams of the 1950s and early 1960s, LSU had yet to break the color barrier. When Truitt showed the LSU athletic director a list of his intended African American recruits, the director replied, "You can't recruit these guys. We aren't ready for this."

The first African American to play basketball at LSU was Collis Temple in 1971, five years after Truitt had departed.

== Kent State University ==
Following the 1965-66 season, Truitt quit at LSU and assumed the head coaching position of the Kent State Golden Flashes men's basketball team in the Mid-American Conference (MAC).

"We'll play every game like it's the only one on our schedule."

— Frank Truitt, 22 November 1968

Three seasons later, in 1968-69, Truitt guided the Golden Flashes to their first winning season in 17 years.

On 4 May 1970, Truitt was inside the Memorial Athletic and Convocation Center on Kent State's campus when Ohio National Guard troops opened fire on a rioting crowd and killed four students, an incident since known as the Kent State shootings.

Truitt's second and final winning season at Kent State, 1970–71, was highlighted by a 64-62 victory over the Purdue Boilermakers in West Lafayette, Indiana on 15 December 1970. This was Kent State's last true road win at a "BCS school" until the Golden Flashes defeated the West Virginia Mountaineers on 15 November 2011. After Truitt's retirement from college basketball following the 1973-74 season, the Golden Flashes did not achieve a winning season again until 1982-83.

Following his eight-year stint as the head basketball coach, Truitt became the head golf coach at Kent State for five years and the head soccer coach for four years.

He won the MAC Coach of the Year award for the 1976-77 golf season, a team led by First-Team All-MAC performer Art Nash. With a MAC title already in hand, the team ultimately finished 23rd in the NCAA tournament. This marked the highest national finish for the Golden Flashes until the 1989-1990 team finished tied for 18th place in the nation.

== Return to Columbus ==
Truitt resigned as the head golf and soccer coach at Kent State in 1978 and moved to Upper Arlington, Ohio. He taught and coached basketball at Bishop Watterson High School for six years before retiring in 1986. Truitt and his wife, Kay, worked together in real estate for over 20 years before retiring in 2009.

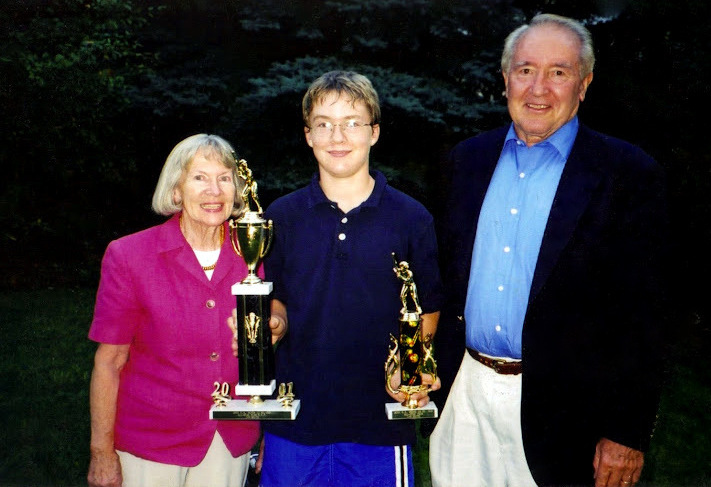
Frank Truitt with wife Kay and one of his five grandsons in Upper Arlington, 2001

In his final coaching stint, Truitt served as the head coach of Buckeye Valley Middle School's golf team in 2001.

Among other awards, Truitt was inducted into the North High Polar Bear Hall of Fame in 1996, the Ohio Veterans Hall of Fame in 2009, and the Otterbein University Athletics Hall of Fame in 2010.

In 2006, Bob Knight gave Truitt a lifetime membership to the Ohio Basketball Hall of Fame.

== Personal ==
Truitt was an avid golfer for over 70 years, beginning in 1935 at age 10. He eventually won club championships at York Golf Club, Washington Courthouse Country Club, Mount Gilead Country Club, and the Kent State University Golf Club. He was also the Caddy Master at Brookside Country Club before enrolling at Otterbein.

Frank and Kay were married for 66 years and had three daughters and nine grandchildren.

Frank's mother, Charlotte Hook Truitt, lived to be 106 years old.
