= Collis Temple =

American basketball player (born 1952)

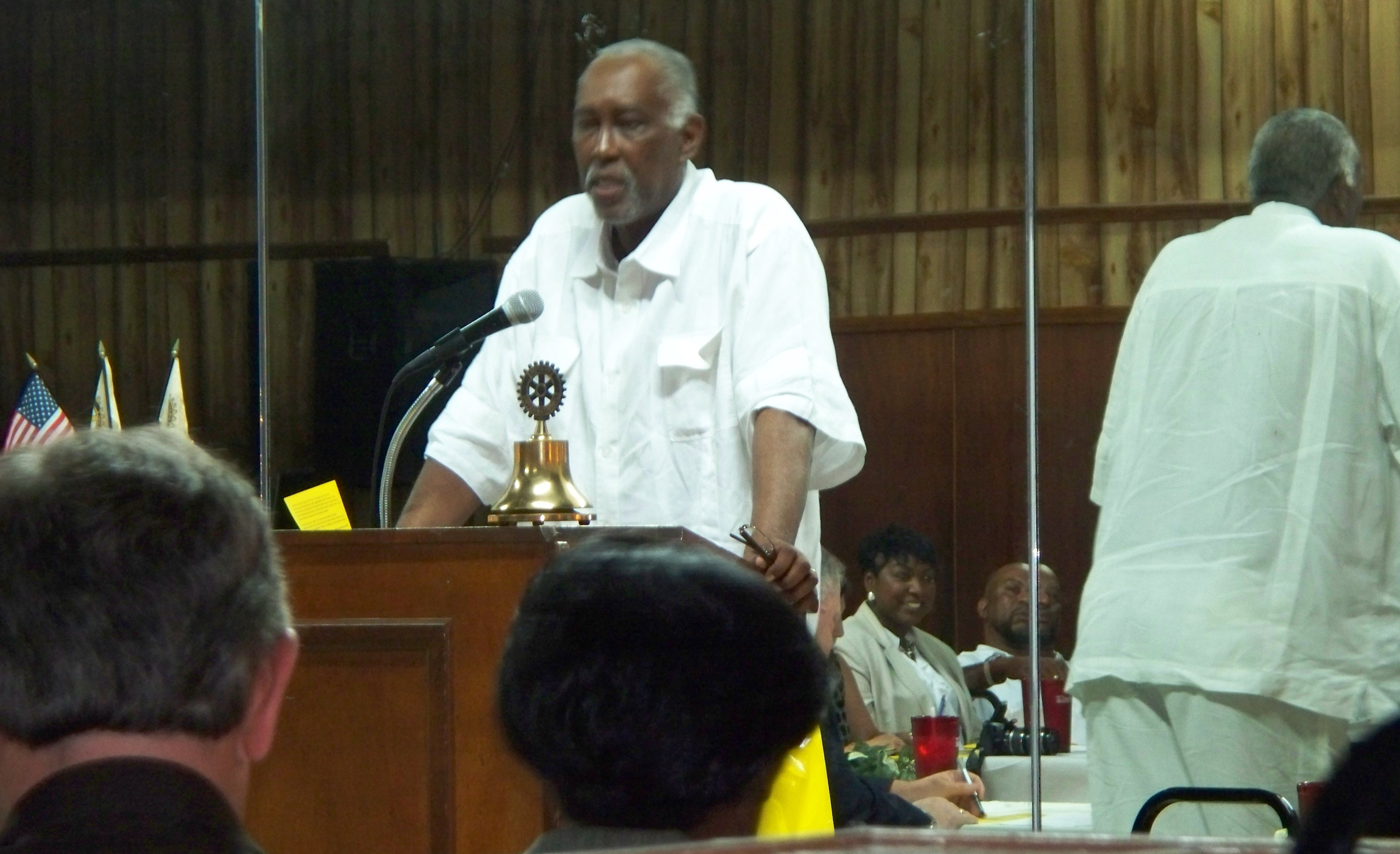
- Temple at the 2011 banquet of the Kentwood, Louisiana Rotary Club

Personal information
- Born: November 8, 1952 (age 74) Kentwood, Louisiana, U. S.
- Listed height: 6 ft 8 in (2.03 m)
- Listed weight: 220 lb (100 kg)

Career information
- High school: O.W. Dillon (Kentwood, Louisiana)
- College: LSU (1971–1974)
- NBA draft: 1974: 6th round, 94th overall pick
- Drafted by: Phoenix Suns
- Position: Small forward
- Number: 40

Career history
- 1974–1975: San Antonio Spurs
- 1975: Iberia Superstars
- Stats at Basketball Reference

Collis Temple Jr. (born November 8, 1952) is an American former professional basketball player for the San Antonio Spurs in the American Basketball Association (ABA). He played college basketball for the LSU Tigers.

== Career ==
=== College ===
The Kentwood, Louisiana native was the first African-American to play varsity basketball at Louisiana State University (LSU). When he joined the team in 1971, the Louisiana National Guard was called to protect him from angry segregationists. In the fourth season of the Slate podcast Slow Burn, Temple shared his experiences interacting with a young David Duke while they were both students at LSU.

As a senior, Temple earned All-Southeastern Conference honors after averaging 15.0 points and 10.5 rebounds per game. In 2017, Temple was elected to the Louisiana State University Athletic Hall of Fame.

=== Professional ===
Temple was selected by the Phoenix Suns with the 94th pick of the 1974 NBA draft. He spent one season (1974–75) with the San Antonio Spurs. He averaged 1.8 points and 1.3 rebounds in 24 games. In February 1975, he joined the Iberia Superstars of the European Professional Basketball League.

== Personal ==
Temple has three sons and one daughter. Collis III and Garrett Temple both played at LSU. His daughter-in-law is Miss USA 2017 winner Kára Temple.

== Career statistics ==
Legend
GP	Games played	GS	Games started	MPG	Minutes per game
FG%	Field goal percentage	3P%	3-point field goal percentage	FT%	Free throw percentage
RPG	Rebounds per game	APG	Assists per game	SPG	Steals per game
BPG	Blocks per game	PPG	Points per game	**Bold**	Career high

=== ABA ===
==== Regular season ====
Year	Team	GP	MPG	FG%	3P%	FT%	RPG	APG	SPG	BPG	PPG
1974–75	San Antonio	24	4.3	.415	.000	.800	1.3	.6	.2	.2	1.8
