= R. E. Edmonds =

Playing career

Basketball
- 1916–1918: LSU
- Position: Forward

Coaching career (HC unless noted)

Basketball
- 1918–1919: LSU

Head coaching record
- Overall: 1–0

R. E. Edmonds was a college basketball player and coach for the LSU Tigers.

He served as head coach for LSU basketball for one season during the 1918–1919 season. Long had an overall record of 1–0 during his one season as head coach. The previous coach C. C. Stroud retired, and LSU won one game against Jefferson College 66 to 18.
