= John Brady (basketball) =

American basketball coach (born 1954)

Biographical details
- Born: September 17, 1954 (age 72); McComb, Mississippi, U.S.

Playing career
- 1972–1976: Belhaven

Coaching career (HC unless noted)
- 1976–1977: Mississippi State (assistant)
- 1977–1982: Crowley HS (LA)
- 1982–1990: Mississippi State (assistant)
- 1990–1991: New Orleans (assistant)
- 1991–1997: Samford
- 1997–2008: LSU
- 2008–2016: Arkansas State

Head coaching record
- Overall: 402–344 (college)
- Tournaments: 6–4 (NCAA Division I); 1–2 (NIT)

Accomplishments and honors

Championships
- NCAA Division I regional – Final Four (2006); 2 SEC regular season (2000, 2006)

Awards
- 2× SEC Coach of the Year (2000, 2006); Sun Belt Coach of the Year (2010)

John Emmett Brady (born September 17, 1954) is an American college basketball coach and the former head men's basketball coach at Arkansas State University.

Brady was previously the head men's basketball coach at Louisiana State University in Baton Rouge, Louisiana. On February 8, 2008, LSU dismissed Brady, and named his assistant coach, Butch Pierre, the interim head coach for the remainder of the season. On March 21, 2008 John Brady was named the 15th head basketball coach at Arkansas State University.

Brady had coached the Tigers to an unlikely Final Four run in the 2006 NCAA tournament, the fourth men's Final Four in LSU history.

== Early life and education ==
Brady was born in McComb, Mississippi, about 80 miles (130 km) south of Jackson. He earned his BS from Belhaven College in 1976, where he played varsity basketball. He then received his master's in Education from Mississippi State University in 1977.

== Coaching career ==
=== Early career ===
After a year as a graduate assistant at Mississippi State, Brady began coaching in the high school ranks of Louisiana. In 1981 Brady was named the Louisiana Sports Writers Association Class AAA "Coach of the Year." After returning to MSU to serve eight years as an assistant under Bob Boyd and Richard Williams, Brady was named head coach at Samford University in 1992. At the time of his departure, Brady was the winningest coach in Samford history, garnering an 89–77 record in six seasons.

=== LSU ===
In 1997, Brady replaced the legendary Dale Brown as head coach at LSU. When Brady arrived, the program was under probation and stinging from a recruiting scandal. Brady's first two years were rough.

In 2000 the Tigers broke through, posting a 28–6 record and an NCAA Tournament Sweet 16 appearance. However, due to the loss of Stromile Swift and Jabari Smith to the 2000 NBA draft, the Tigers could not carry their momentum to the next year, going 13–16 in 2001.

Brady's team entered the 2005–06 season unranked, but were coming off a solid season in which they went 20–10 and made the NCAA tournament. Led by Glen "Big Baby" Davis and Tyrus Thomas, the Tigers won their first outright SEC regular season championship since 1985, and earned a #4 seed in the NCAA tournament. After wins over Iona and Texas A&M, LSU defeated the #1 seed Duke and #2 seed Texas to make it to their first Final Four since 1986. Set at the RCA Dome in Indianapolis, Indiana, the 2006 Final Four was the first since 1980 to feature no #1 seeds (LSU, #2 UCLA, #3 Florida and #11 George Mason). Facing the #2 seed Bruins in the national semifinals, the Tigers were unable to solve UCLA's defense, losing 59–45, dropping LSU to 0–6 all-time in the men's Final Four (and 0–10 in all Final Four games, including an 0–4 mark in the women's Final Four). Despite the loss, the 2005–06 season will be remembered as one of the most successful in LSU men's basketball history. John Brady was fired in the middle of his 11th season as LSU's head basketball coach and just two seasons after the Tigers' latest Final Four appearance.

In 10 seasons at LSU, Brady compiled a 184–126 record, including two SEC Regular Season Titles and four NCAA tournament appearances.

On February 8, 2008, Brady was fired from LSU. Earlier news reports stated that he would coach the Tennessee game on February 9, but LSU officials stated that his termination was immediate. Brady's assistant coach, Butch Pierre, took over as the interim head coach.

Brady is now the color commentator for radio broadcasts of LSU games.

=== Arkansas State ===
On March 18, 2008, Brady was hired by Arkansas State as head basketball coach.

Brady won two division titles in the Sun Belt while the Red Wolves' coach, but was unable to ever get his team to the postseason and he announced at the beginning of the 2015–16 season that he would resign as coach, effective at the end of the season.

== Head coaching record ==
Record table
Season	Team	Overall	Conference	Standing	Postseason
Samford Bulldogs (Atlantic Sun Conference) (1991–1997)
1991–92	Samford	11–18	7–7	T–3rd	
1992–93	Samford	17–10	7–5	T–2nd	
1993–94	Samford	10–18	4–12	8th	
1994–95	Samford	16–11	11–5	T–2nd	
1995–96	Samford	16–11	11–5	1st (West)	
1996–97	Samford	19–9	11–5	1st (West)	
Samford:		89–77 (.536)	51–39 (.567)		
LSU Tigers (Southeastern Conference) (1997–2008)
1997–98	LSU	9–18	2–14	6th (West)	
1998–99	LSU	12–15	4–12	6th (West)	
1999–00	LSU	28–6	12–4	1st (West)	NCAA Division I Sweet 16
2000–01	LSU	13–16	2–14	6th (West)	
2001–02	LSU	19–15	6–10	T–4th (West)	NIT Second Round
2002–03	LSU	21–11	8–8	T–2nd (West)	NCAA Division I First Round
2003–04	LSU	18–11	8–8	T–2nd (West)	NIT First Round
2004–05	LSU	20–10	12–4	T–1st (West)	NCAA Division I First Round
2005–06	LSU	27–9	14–2	1st (West)	NCAA Division I Final Four
2006–07	LSU	17–15	5–11	6th (West)	
2007–08	LSU	8–13	1–6		
LSU:		192–139 (.580)	74–93 (.443)		
Arkansas State Red Wolves (Sun Belt Conference) (2008–2016)
2008–09	Arkansas State	13–17	5–13	7th (West)	
2009–10	Arkansas State	17–14	11–7	2nd (West)	
2010–11	Arkansas State	17–14	11–5	1st (West)	
2011–12	Arkansas State	14–20	6–10	5th (West)	
2012–13	Arkansas State	19–12	12–8	1st (West)	
2013–14	Arkansas State	19–13	10–8	T–4th	
2014–15	Arkansas State	11–18	6–14	10th	
2015–16	Arkansas State	11–20	7–13	T–9th	
Arkansas State:		121–128 (.486)	68–78 (.466)		
Total:		402–344 (.539)			
National champion Postseason invitational champion Conference regular season champion Conference regular season and conference tournament champion Division regular season champion Division regular season and conference tournament champion Conference tournament champion

== Broadcasting career ==
Brady became the LSU Tigers basketball color analyst starting in the 2017–2018 season.

== See also ==
- List of NCAA Division I Men's Final Four appearances by coach
