= F. M. Long =

Coaching career (HC unless noted)

Basketball
- 1911–1913: LSU

Track and field
- 1912: LSU

Head coaching record
- Overall: 6–9 (basketball)

F. M. Long was a college basketball and track and field coach.

He served as head coach for LSU basketball for two seasons from 1911 to 1913. Long had an overall record of 6–9. He had a 4–6 record (2–3 SIAA) record during the 1911–1912 season and 2–3 (1–3 SIAA) record during the 1912–13 season.

Long was also head coach of the LSU Tigers track and field team in 1912.
