= Butch Pierre =

American basketball player and coach

Current position
- Title: Assistant coach

Biographical details
- Born: October 4, 1962 (age 64); Darrow, Louisiana, U.S.

Playing career
- 1980–1984: Mississippi State
- Position: Point guard

Coaching career (HC unless noted)
- 1984–1986: Mississippi State (asst.)
- 1986–1988: Kentucky State (asst.)
- 1988–1996: Southwestern Louisiana (asst.)
- 1996–1997: Charlotte (asst.)
- 1997–2002: LSU (asst.)
- 2002–2008: LSU (Asst. HC)
- 2008: LSU (Interim HC)
- 2008–2016: Oklahoma State (asst.)
- 2016–2017: NC State (asst.)
- 2019–2021: Northwest Florida State College
- 2022–2023: Wichita State (asst.)

Administrative career (AD unless noted)
- 2017–2018: Memphis (director of player personnel)

Head coaching record
- Overall: 5–5 (.500)

Butch Pierre (born October 4, 1962) is a college basketball coach, currently serving as head coach at Northwest Florida State College. Prior to his stint at Northwest State Florida College, Pierre served as the director for player personnel for the University of Memphis Tigers men's basketball team under coach Tubby Smith during the 2017-18 season. Prior to that, he was an assistant coach for the NC State Wolfpack men's basketball team, Oklahoma State Cowboys basketball team and is also the former interim head coach of the Louisiana State University men's basketball team. Pierre, a 9-year assistant at LSU, replaced former head coach John Brady, who was fired on February 8, 2008.

Pierre was born in Darrow, Louisiana. He is a 1984 graduate of Mississippi State University with a degree in education. He received a master's degree in education from Mississippi State in 1986.

== Head coaching record ==
Record table
Season	Team	Overall	Conference	Standing	Postseason
LSU Tigers (Southeastern Conference) (2008)
2007–08	LSU	5–5	5–5		
LSU:		5–5	5–5		
Total:		5-5			
National champion Postseason invitational champion Conference regular season champion Conference regular season and conference tournament champion Division regular season champion Division regular season and conference tournament champion Conference tournament champion
